= 2MASSW J2148+4003 =

Brown dwarf system

Observation data Epoch J2000.0 Equinox J2000.0
- Constellation: Cygnus
- Right ascension: 21^{h} 48^{m} 16.30^{s}
- Declination: +40° 03′ 59.3″

Characteristics
- Evolutionary stage: Brown dwarf
- Spectral type: L6pec

Astrometry
Parallax (π)	123.2758±0.4557 mas
Distance	26.46 ± 0.10 ly (8.11 ± 0.03 pc)

Other designations
- 2MASSW J21481628+4003593, 2MASS J21481628+4003593, WISEA J214817.01+400404.1, TIC 305387751, Gaia DR3 1954170404122975232

Database references
SIMBAD	data

2MASSW J21481628+4003593 (also known as 2MASSW J2148+4003) is a nearby L-type brown dwarf located in the constellation of Cygnus. It is notable for its peculiar, dusty atmosphere indicative of high metallicity.

== Observation ==
The object was discovered in 2008 during a proper-motion survey using multiepoch data from the Two Micron All Sky Survey (2MASS), which covered approximately 4700 square degrees of sky near the Galactic plane.

Optical spectroscopy classifies 2MASS J21481628+4003593 as spectral type L6, with some classifications noting it as L6 peculiar due to its atypical features. In the near-infrared, it displays a triangular-shaped H-band continuum, strong carbon monoxide absorption, and an unusually red J − Ks color of 2.38 ± 0.06. Mid-infrared observations show prominent silicate absorption features between 9 and 11 μm, attributed to thick condensate clouds in its atmosphere.

These properties are interpreted as arising from enhanced dust content due to high metallicity, rather than low surface gravity from youth. Atmospheric models suggest an effective temperature (Teff) of approximately 1500 K and solar to supersolar metallicity.
