= Submillimetre Common-User Bolometer Array =

Either of two instruments used on the James Clerk Maxwell Telescope

Coordinates: 19.8228°N 155.4770°W

Two instruments known as the Submillimetre Common-User Bolometer Array, or SCUBA, have been used for detecting submillimetre radiation on the James Clerk Maxwell Telescope in Hawaii.

== SCUBA-1 ==
The older continuum single pixel UKT14 bolometer receiver was replaced in the 1990s by the Submillimeter Common-User Bolometer Array (SCUBA). The SCUBA project was green-lighted in 1987 by the JCMT board and was in development for nearly a decade before it saw first light on the telescope. While it was not the first bolometer array it was "unique in combining an unparallel sensitivity with an extensive wavelength range and field-of-view".

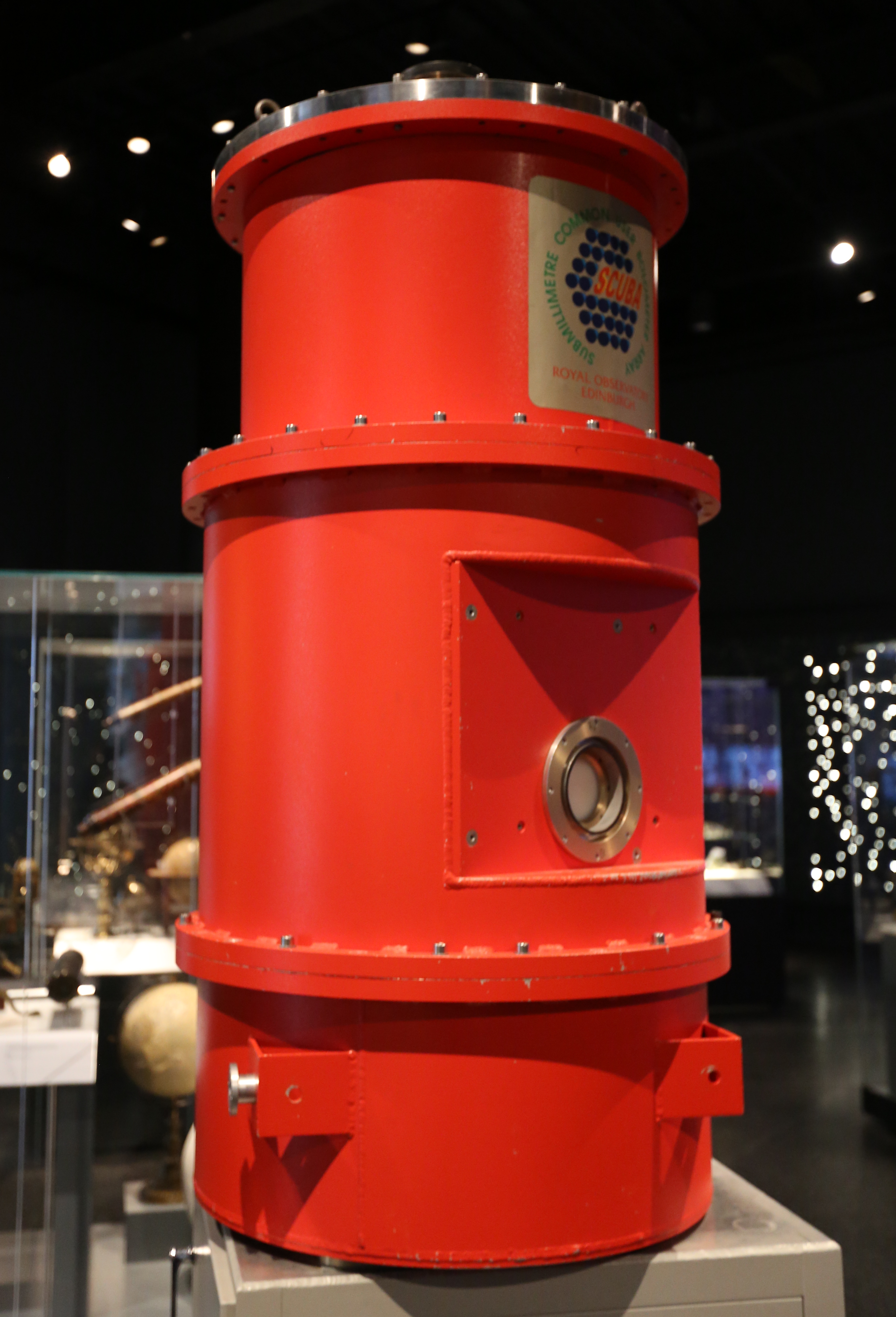
The Submillimetre Common-User Bolometer Array

SCUBA operated simultaneously at wavelengths of 450 and 850 micron (with 91 and 37 pixels, respectively), and was sensitive to the thermal emission from interstellar dust. SCUBA is ranked second only to the Hubble Space Telescope in terms of publication of high-impact astronomical research. SCUBA was retired from service in 2005, and it is now in the National Museum of Scotland in Edinburgh.

== SCUBA-2 ==
SCUBA-2, another continuum instrument, was commissioned in 2011. This ground-breaking camera consists of large arrays of superconducting transition edge sensors with a mapping speed hundreds of times larger than SCUBA. It has 5120 array elements at both 450 and 850 micron wavelength (10,240 total pixels). It has been conducting the JCMT legacy surveys since November, 2011, including the SCUBA-2 All Sky Survey, and was made available for general astronomical observations in February, 2012. Two ancillary instruments, FTS-2 and POL-2, add spectroscopic and polarimetric capabilities to SCUBA-2.

=== SCUBA-2 All Sky Survey ===
The SCUBA-2 All-Sky Survey (SASSy), is an astronomical survey using the SCUBA-2 camera to map the sky at submillimeter wavelengths (850 μm). It is most sensitive to very cold gas and dust. The survey started in 2011. A team of around 50 astronomers from the United Kingdom, Canada, the United States, Netherlands, and Japan aim to map a huge swathe of the sky to find rare galaxies and stars being formed.

The survey will achieve an angular resolution of 14 arcseconds, 1800 times more detailed than the best previous full-sky map in the sub-mm from COBE, which had only 7° angular resolution (25200 arcseconds).

Despite its name, the project will not be able to map the southernmost areas of the sky that are not visible from the James Clerk Maxwell Telescope in Hawaii.

SASSy is one of the major "legacy surveys" on the James Clerk Maxwell Telescope. It is the second-largest such legacy survey in terms of time on this telescope, and in terms of notional facility time is "worth" over £1 million.

The project seeks to answer the following questions:

- Is there an undiscovered population of extreme luminosity galaxies?
- What are the number counts of bright sub-mm galaxies?
- What is the fraction of lens sub-mm sources?
- Is there an undiscovered population of cold local galaxies?
- How many infrared dark clouds are there in our Galaxy and how are they distributed?
- What is the relation of infrared dark clouds to star formation and Galactic structure?
- Is there an underlying unknown population of star formation?
- What is the fraction of clustered vs. isolated star formation?
- What is the answer to the distributed T-Tauri problem?

This project will also assist in the foreground subtraction and calibration of the Planck microwave background satellite.

The project was led initially by Dr. Mark Thompson and Dr. Stephen Serjeant (University of Hertfordshire and Open University respectively), now expanded to a four-person co-ordinating team with the addition of Dr. Tim Jenness and Prof. Douglas Scott (Joint Astronomy Centre, Hawaii, and University of British Columbia respectively). The collaboration includes Cardiff University, UK; European Space Agency; Herzberg Institute of Astrophysics / NRC, Canada; Imperial College London, UK; Japan Aerospace Exploration Agency, Japan; Joint Astronomy Centre, Hawaii, USA; Kapteyn Astronomical Institute, The Netherlands; Keele University, UK; Liverpool John Moores University, UK; Open University, UK; Rutherford Appleton Laboratory, UK; SRON, The Netherlands; UK Astronomy Technology Centre, UK; Université Laval, Canada; University College London, UK; University of British Columbia, Canada; University of Cambridge, UK; University of Edinburgh, UK; University of Exeter, UK; University of Hertfordshire, UK; University of Kent, UK; University of St Andrews, UK; University of Waterloo, Canada

== See also ==
- Infrared astronomy
- Submillimeter astronomy
- Far infrared astronomy
- Radio astronomy
