= LHS 1815 b =

Exoplanet

Discovery
- Discovered by: TESS
- Discovery date: 2020
- Detection method: Transit

Orbital characteristics
- Semi-major axis: 0.0404 AU
- Eccentricity: 0
- Orbital period (sidereal): 3.8 d
- Star: LHS 1815

Physical characteristics
- Mean radius: 1.088 R_{🜨}
- Mass: 1.58 M_{🜨}

LHS 1815 b (also known as TOI-704 b) is a thick disk exoplanet discovered in 2020 by TESS. The planet is located outside the galactic plane.

== Characteristics ==
LHS 1815 b is a terrestrial planet (super-Earth) with a mass of 0.0132 M_{J} and a radius of 0.09707 R_{J}, discovered by TESS in 2020. It is the first known example of a "thick-disk planet" located within the galactic thick disk, a structure much higher than the positions of other planetary systems discovered by TESS."

== Orbit ==
The orbital period is 3.81433 days and the semimajor axis is 0.0404 au.

== Other designations ==
LHS 1815 b is also known as TOI-704 b and TIC 260004324 b.
