= Submillimetre astronomy =

Astronomy with terahertz (< 1 mm)-range light

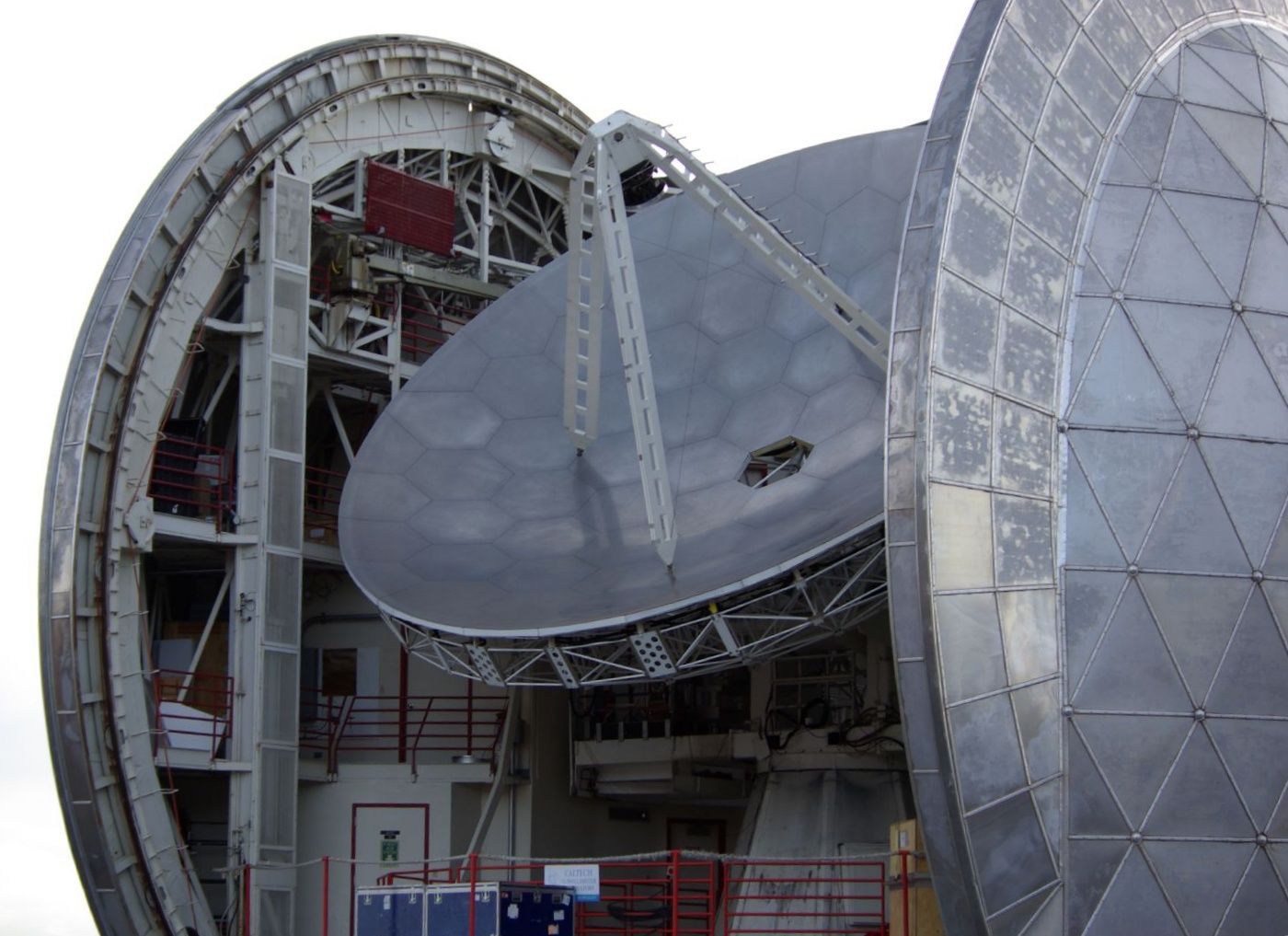
The Caltech Submillimeter Observatory at Mauna Kea Observatory was commissioned in 1988, and had a 10.4 m (34 ft) dish

Submillimetre astronomy or submillimeter astronomy (see spelling differences) is the branch of observational astronomy that is conducted at submillimetre wavelengths (i.e., terahertz radiation) of the electromagnetic spectrum. Astronomers place the submillimetre waveband between the far-infrared and microwave wavebands, typically taken to be between a few hundred micrometres and a millimetre. It is still common in submillimetre astronomy to quote wavelengths in 'microns', the old name for micrometre.

Submillimetre observations can be used to trace emission from gas and dust, including the CI, CO, and CII lines. Sources behind this emission include molecular clouds and dark cloud cores, which can be used to clarify the process of star formation from earliest collapse to stellar birth, by determining chemical abundances in dark clouds and the cooling mechanisms for the molecules which comprise them. Other sources include protoplanetary discs, dusty starburst galaxies in the early Universe, immediate environments surrounding AGN, and secondary anisotropies in the cosmic microwave background. Astronomers estimate that interstellar dust absorbs up to half of all radiation emitted by stars and galaxies, which is re-emitted in the far-infrared and submillimeter bands, making submillimeter observations key to understanding the universe. Recent findings have utilized submillimetre astronomy to measure the Sunyaev–Zeldovich effect in galaxy clusters, proving the existence of hot Intracluster medium.

Submillimetre observations have been used to constrain models of planetary, stellar, and galactic formation and evolution. By studying foreground elements of the CMB and environments around SMBHs, submillimetre astronomy can also be used to constrain models of quantum gravity and to investigate the role of gravitational waves and relativistic neutrinos in the early Universe. Notably, the Event Horizon Telescope, which produce the first image of a black hole in 2020 using radio and far-infrared observations, also conducts VLBI observations within the submillimeter regime at 870μm.

== From the ground ==
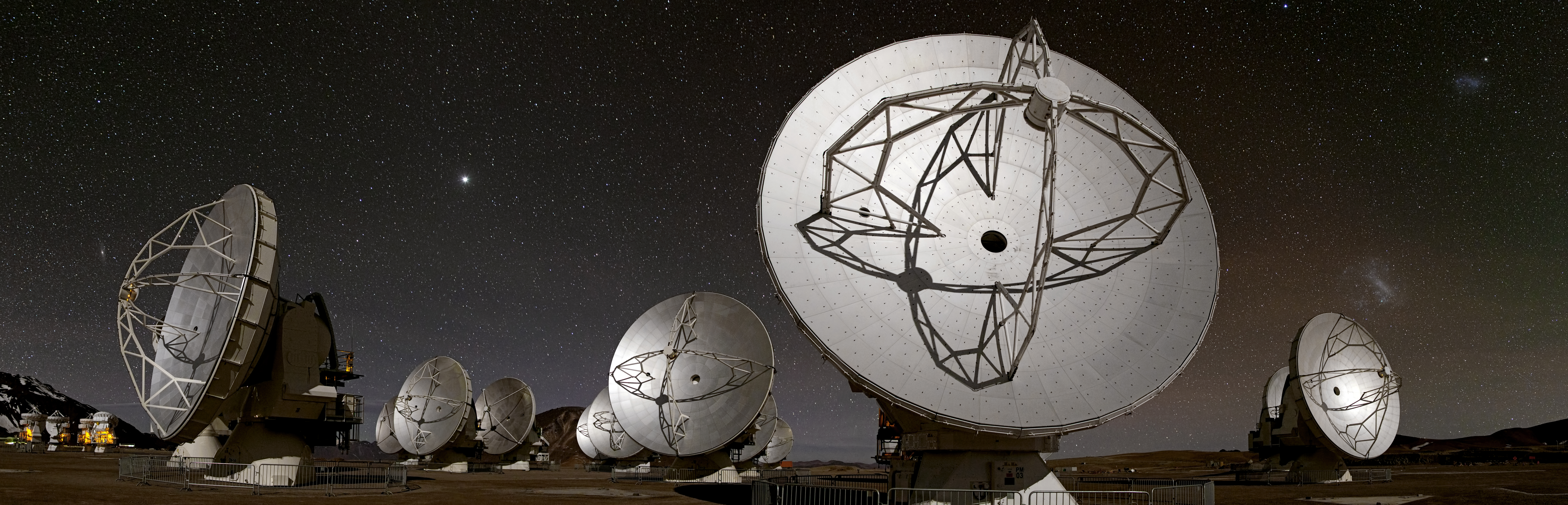
Panoramic view of the Chajnantor plateau, spanning about 180 degrees from north (on the left) to south (on the right) shows the antennas of the Atacama Large Millimeter Array.

The most significant limitations to the detection of astronomical emission at submillimetre wavelengths with ground-based observatories are atmospheric emission, noise and attenuation. Like the infrared, the submillimetre atmosphere is dominated by numerous water vapour absorption bands and it is only through "windows" between these bands that observations are possible. The ideal submillimetre observing site is dry, cool, has stable weather conditions and is away from urban population centres. Only a handful of sites have been identified. They include Mauna Kea (Hawaii, United States), the Llano de Chajnantor Observatory on the Atacama Plateau (Chile), the South Pole, and Hanle in India (the Himalayan site of the Indian Astronomical Observatory). Comparisons show that all four sites are excellent for submillimetre astronomy, and of these sites Mauna Kea is the most established and arguably the most accessible. There has been some recent interest in high-altitude Arctic sites, particularly Summit Station in Greenland where the PWV (precipitable water vapor) measure is always better than at Mauna Kea (however Mauna Kea's lower latitude of 19 degrees means it can observe more of the southern skies than Greenland).

Satellite comparisons have found that PWV levels on Dome A and Dome C to be the most consistent and dry. Other high-altitude Chilean sites can achieve similar results during certain parts of the year.

The Llano de Chajnantor Observatory site hosts the Atacama Pathfinder Experiment (APEX), the largest submillimetre telescope operating in the southern hemisphere, and the world's largest ground based astronomy project, the Atacama Large Millimeter Array (ALMA), an interferometer for submillimetre wavelength observations made of 54 12-metre and 12 7-metre radio telescopes. North of this site is Cerro Chajnantor, which will host the 6-metre CCAT-prime (FYST), the first wide-field survey telescope in the submillimetre range, as part of the CCAT collaboration. First light for FYST is scheduled for 2026.

The Submillimeter Array (SMA) is another interferometer, located at Mauna Kea, consisting of eight 6-metre diameter radio telescopes. The largest existing submillimetre telescope, the James Clerk Maxwell Telescope, is also located on Mauna Kea.

Some submillimetre telescopes are also used for VLBI.

== From the stratosphere ==
With high-altitude balloons and aircraft, one can get above more of the atmosphere. The Balloon-borne Large Aperture Submillimeter Telescope (BLAST) and the Stratospheric Observatory For Infrared Astronomy (SOFIA) are two examples, although SOFIA can also handle near infrared observations.

== From orbit ==
Comparison
Name	Year	Wavelength	Aperture
Human Eye	–	0.39–0.75 μm	0.01 m
SWAS	1998	540–610 μm	0.55–0.7 m
Herschel	2009	55–672 μm	3.5 m

Space-based observations at the submillimetre wavelengths remove the ground-based limitations of atmospheric absorption. The first submillimeter telescope in space was the Soviet BST-1M, located in the scientific equipment compartment of the Salyut-6 orbital station. It was equipped with a mirror with a diameter of 1.5 m and was intended for astrophysical research in the ultraviolet (0.2–0.36 microns), infrared (60–130 microns) and submillimeter (300–1000 microns) spectral regions, allowing groups who are interested in molecular clouds in space to study them, as well as obtaining information regarding processes in the upper layer of Earth's atmosphere.

The Submillimeter Wave Astronomy Satellite (SWAS) was launched into low Earth orbit on December 5, 1998 as one of NASA's Small Explorer Program (SMEX) missions. The mission of the spacecraft was to make targeted observations of giant molecular clouds and dark cloud cores. The focus of SWAS was five spectral lines: water (H_{2}O), isotopic water (H_{2}^{18}O), isotopic carbon monoxide (^{13}CO), molecular oxygen (O_{2}), and neutral carbon (C I). These spectral lines were picked to answer questions about cloud cooling, reservoirs of oxygen, chemical compositions, and physical properties of the observed molecular clouds.

The SWAS satellite was repurposed in June, 2005 to provide support for the NASA Deep Impact mission. SWAS provided water production data on the comet until the end of August 2005.

The European Space Agency launched a space-based mission known as the Herschel Space Observatory (formerly called Far Infrared and Sub-millimetre Telescope or FIRST) in 2009. Herschel deployed the largest mirror ever launched into space (until December 2021, with the launch of the near-infrared James Webb Space Telescope) and studied radiation in the far infrared and submillimetre wavebands. Rather than an Earth orbit, Herschel entered into a Lissajous orbit around L_{2}, the second Lagrangian point of the Earth-Sun system. L_{2} is located approximately 1.5 million km from Earth and the placement of Herschel there lessened the interference by infrared and visible radiation from the Earth and Sun. Herschel's mission focused primarily on the origins of galaxies and galactic formation.

== See also ==
- Event Horizon Telescope
- Terahertz radiation
- Far infrared astronomy
- SCUBA-2 All Sky Survey
- Radio window
- Infrared window
- Optical window
- Category:Submillimetre telescopes
