= IC 335 =

Lenticular Galaxy in the constellation Fornax

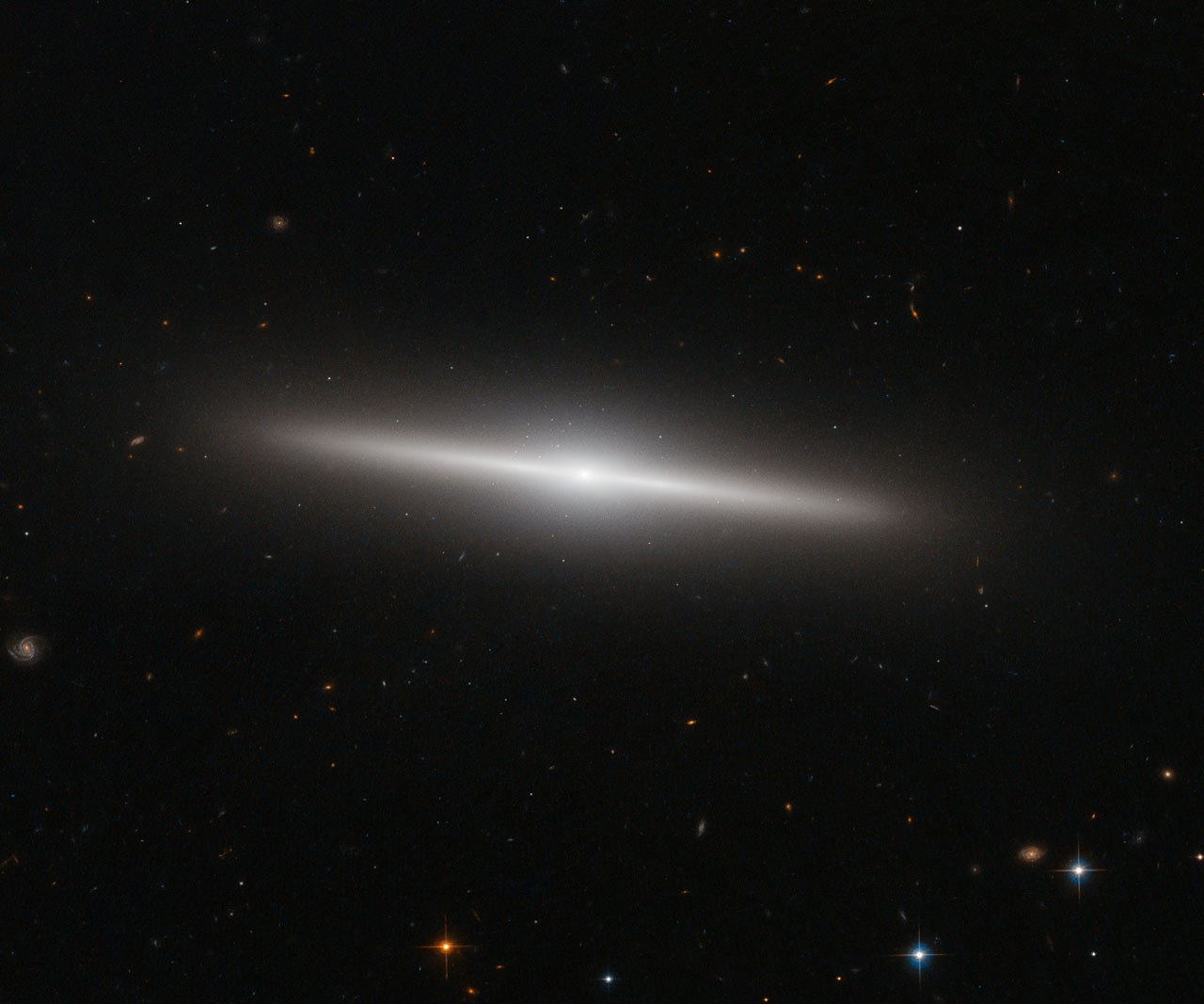
- IC 335 image taken by Hubble Space Telescope's Advanced Camera for Surveys.

Observation data (J2000 epoch)
- Constellation: Fornax
- Right ascension: 03^{h} 35^{m} 31.029^{s}
- Declination: −34° 26′ 49.55″
- Redshift: 0.005480
- Heliocentric radial velocity: 1638
- Distance: 59.06 ± 12.77 Mly (18.107 ± 3.914 Mpc)
- Group or cluster: Fornax Cluster
- Apparent magnitude (B): 12.9

Characteristics
- Type: S0
- Size: 45,000 ly (14,000 pc)
- Notable features: Edge-on lenticular galaxy

Other designations
- IC 1963, 2MASX J03353102-3426495, FCC 153, MCG-06-08-031, 6dFGS gJ033531.0-342649, ESO 358-26, PGC 13277

IC 335 is an edge-on lenticular galaxy about 60 million light years (18 million parsecs) away, in the constellation Fornax. It is part of the Fornax Cluster.

IC 335 appears very similar to NGC 4452, a lenticular galaxy in Virgo. Both galaxies are edge-on, meaning that their characteristics, like spiral arms, are hidden. Lenticular galaxies like these are thought to be intermediate between spiral galaxies and elliptical galaxies, and like elliptical galaxies, they have very little gas for star formation. IC 335 may have once been a spiral galaxy that ran out of interstellar medium, or it may have collided with a galaxy in the past and thus used up all of its gas (see interacting galaxy).
