= Caltech Submillimeter Observatory =

Decommissioned radio telescope in Hawaii, US

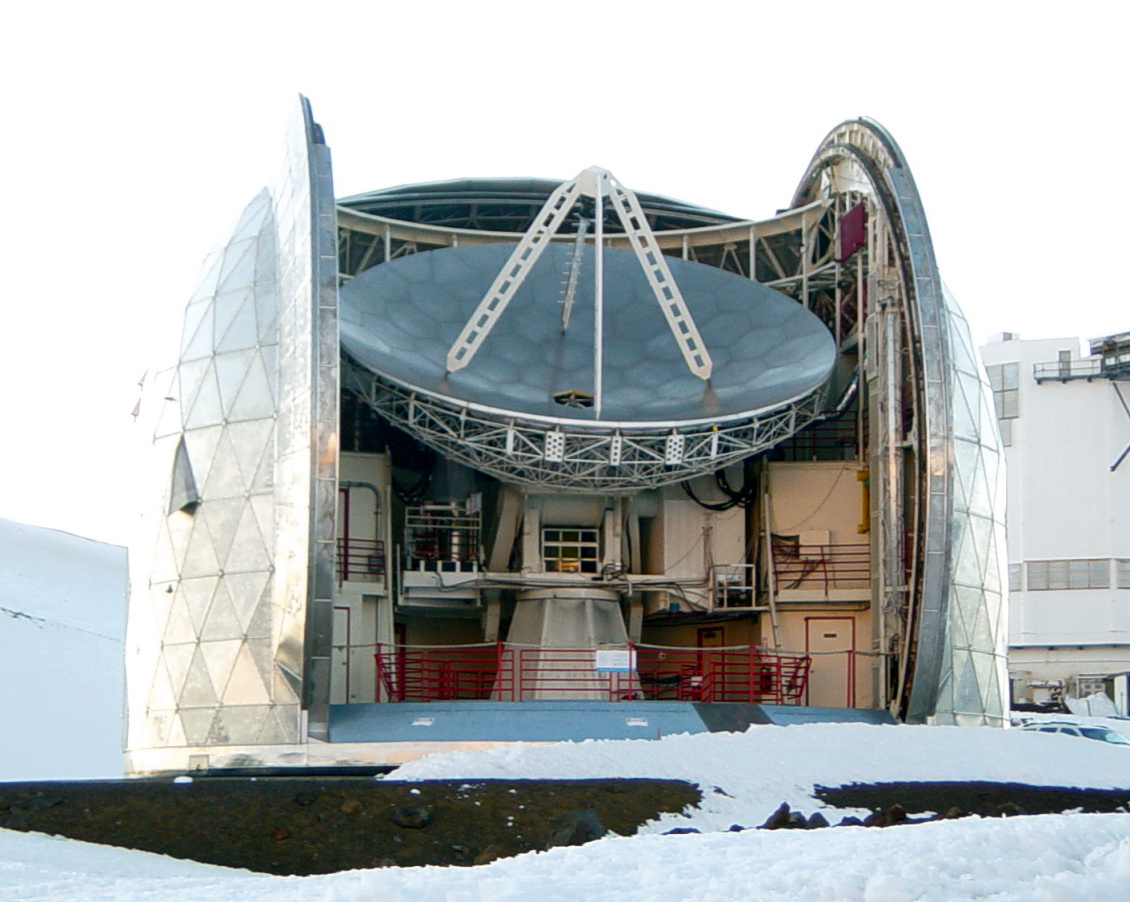
- Location(s): Hawaiʻi County, Hawaii
- Coordinates: 19°49′21″N 155°28′34″W
- Altitude: 13,570 ft (4,140 m)
- Wavelength: 1,300, 350, 850 μm (230, 860, 350 GHz)
- Diameter: 10.4 m (34 ft 1 in)
- Website: www.submm.caltech.edu/cso/
- Location within Hawaii
- Related media on Commons

The Caltech Submillimeter Observatory (CSO) was a 10.4-meter (34 ft) diameter submillimeter wavelength telescope situated alongside the 15-meter (49 ft) James Clerk Maxwell Telescope (JCMT) at Mauna Kea Observatories. Beginning in 1986, it was engaged in submillimeter astronomy of the terahertz radiation band. The telescope closed on September 18, 2015.

Disassembly of the Caltech Submillimeter Observatory's (CSO) 34-foot diameter telescope on Maunakea began the week of August 28, 2023. The entire remediation process is expected to be completed by summer 2024 and cost more than $4 million. CSO is the first observatory to be removed under the Decommissioning Plan of the University of Hawaiʻi Maunakea Comprehensive Management Plan.

== History ==
In 1973 Robert B. Leighton proposed to the NSF to build four 10.4 meter diameter parabolic dish radio antennas. Three of these Leighton antennas were to be used as a millimeter-wave interferometer to be sited at Owens Valley Radio Observatory (OVRO), and the fourth was to be used as a single submillimeter telescope at a high mountain site. The proposal was approved (AST 73-04908), but the NSF insisted that the millimeter-wave array had to be completed before work on the submillimeter telescope could be started, which delayed the construction of the submillimeter telescope by almost a decade. Mauna Kea was selected as the site for the submillimeter telescope, which became the Caltech Submillimeter Observatory, after a site survey by Thomas G. Phillips. The three antenna millimeter-wave interferometer at OVRO was eventually expanded to six elements, and ultimately became part of the Combined Array for Research in Millimeter-wave Astronomy (CARMA) array in California's Inyo Mountains.

The CSO antenna, renamed the Leighton Telescope after Robert Leighton's death in 1997, has a more precise surface than the CARMA array antennas, enabling it to make use of the superior Mauna Kea site by operating at higher frequencies. Heating elements were also added to the stand-off pins that support the hexagonal panels to allow active control of the surface.

Before being deployed to Hawaii, both the antenna (without its dish) and the dome building were assembled on the Caltech campus, at the current site of the Infrared Processing and Analysis Center (IPAC) building in order to ensure that the building and its shutter operated correctly. Despite having assembled the building once on the Caltech campus, the construction contractor had difficulty re-assembling the building in the high altitude environment of Mauna Kea, and the contractor went bankrupt. After the bankruptcy Caltech staff had to supervise completion of the observatory construction.

== Operation ==
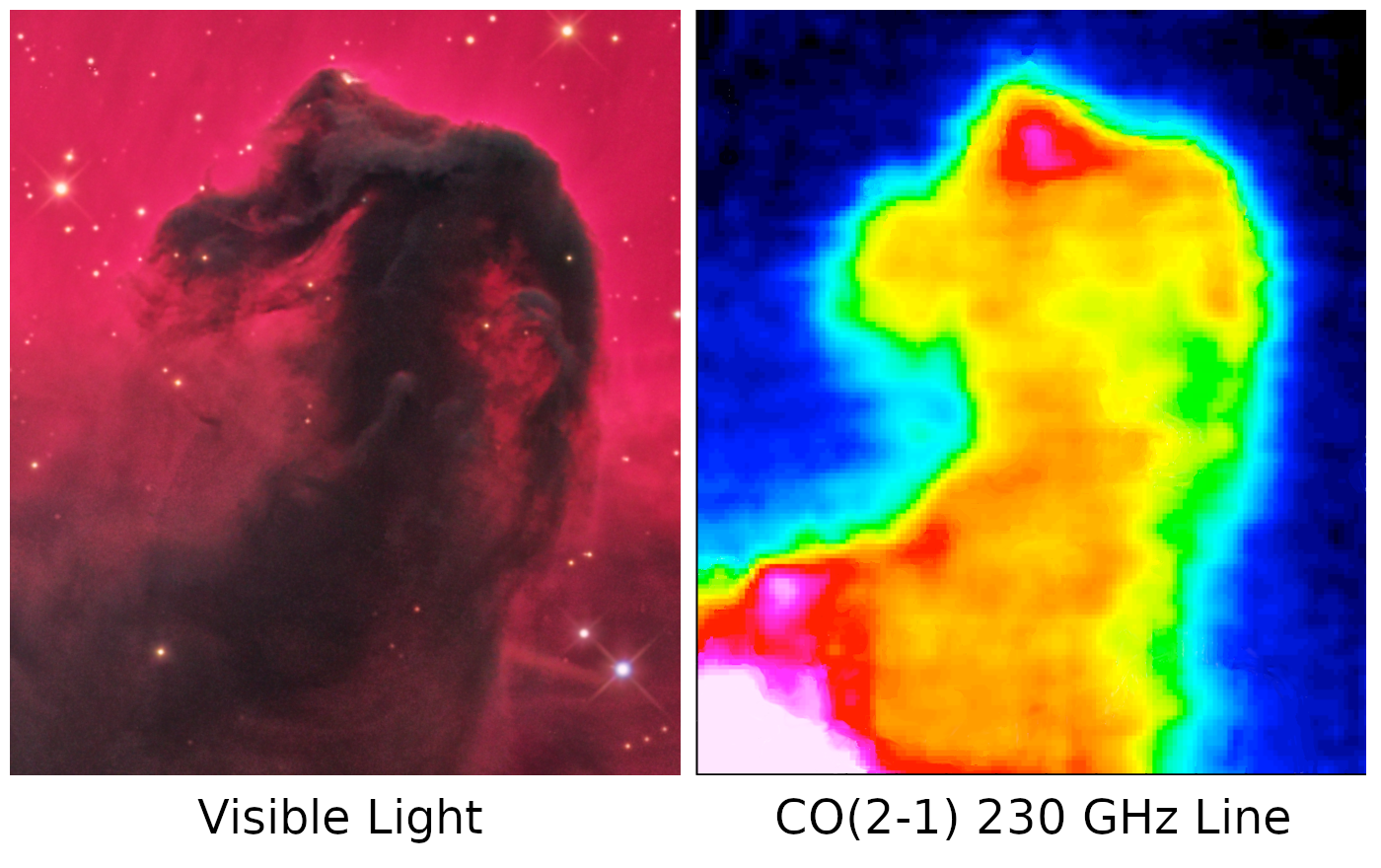
The Horsehead Nebula, as seen in visible light on the left, and on the right as a false color image made from data taken at the CSO, of the intensity of the 230 GHz rotational transition of carbon monoxide.

Throughout its nearly three decade operational lifetime, the CSO was funded primarily by the NSF. The University of Texas provided additional funding from the start of 1988 through the end of 2012.

The CSO emphasized heterodyne receiver work, while the neighboring James Clerk Maxwell Telescope emphasized continuum detector observations. Most of the heterodyne receivers were built on the Caltech campus, and were placed at the Nasmyth focus. The University of Texas team built instruments for the CSO, including a re-imaging system which effectively converted the 10.4 meter telescope into a 1 meter off-axis telescope with a 3 arc minute wide beam at 492 GHz. This wide beam system was used to map the atomic carbon line at 492 GHz over large regions of the sky. The UT team also provided an 850 GHz receiver for the telescope's Cassegrain focus.

In 1986, the CSO obtained official "first light" by producing a spectrum of the carbon monoxide J=2-1 line from the nearby starburst galaxy Messier 82 (although continuum detections of the Moon and some planets had been made earlier).

The CSO and JCMT were combined to form the first submillimeter interferometer. The success of this experiment was important in pushing ahead the construction of the Submillimeter Array and the Atacama Large Millimeter Array interferometers. The CSO was also a part of the Event Horizon Telescope array during the early test observations which proved the feasibility of intercontinental mm-wave interferometry.

Research Highlights:

- The first detection of the Sunyaev-Zel'dovich Effect at millimeter wavelengths, and the first measurement of cluster temperature using the Sunyaev-Zel'dovich Effect.
- The Bolocam Galactic Plane Survey, a survey of continuum emission at 1.1 mm, which covered 170 square degrees of the galactic plane. This survey resulted in the publication of at least 14 journal papers with over 1000 aggregate citations.
- Discovery of new submillimeter water maser spectral lines at 321, 325, 437, 439, 471, and 658 GHz.
- Molecular line surveys in the submillimeter band of the star formation regions Sagittarius B2 and Orion KL; the carbon star IRC+10216; and the planets Jupiter and Saturn.
- Discovery of a ~200 km/sec fast molecular wind from the protoplanetary nebula CRL 618. This fast neutral wind will interact with the slow AGB wind to shape the final planetary nebula.
- Submillimeter observations of the Solar eclipse of July 11, 1991, a very unusual eclipse in that it passed over several major observatories. Observing the Sun would normally have constituted a severe violation of the telescope's sun-avoidance limits, as it was normally forbidden to allow any sunlight to fall upon even a portion of the telescope's primary mirror. However for this special event a tent-like membrane was deployed over the dish, which prevented focused visible and infrared light from destroying the secondary mirror assembly.

The last observation from the telescope was made on 8 September 2015, and was of Orion KL.

Over 100 students from 25 institutions used the CSO for doctoral research projects.

== Decommissioning ==
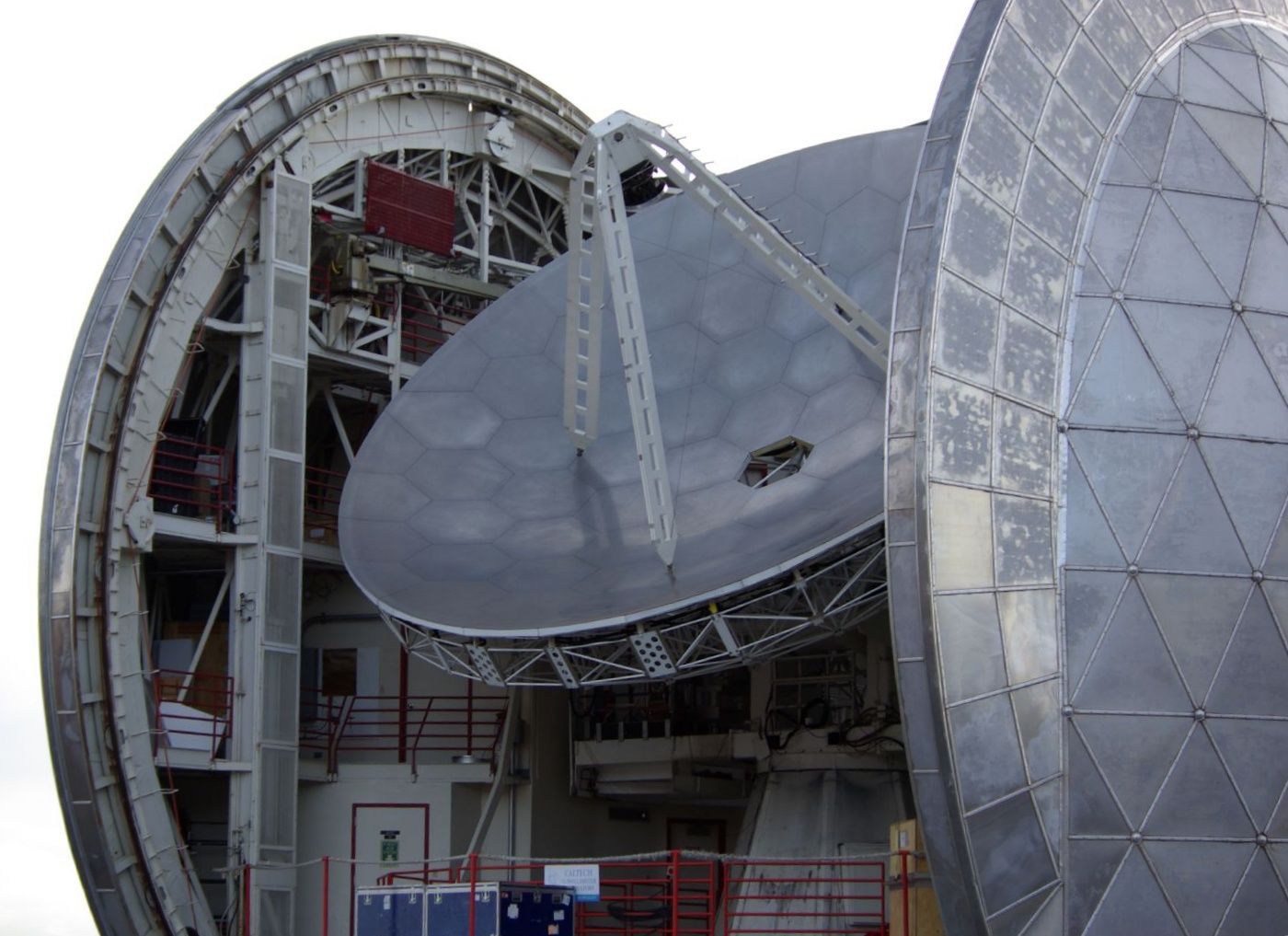
Caltech Submillimeter Observatory.

In order to get a permit to build the Thirty Meter Telescope project on Mauna Kea, the University of Hawaii had to commit to closing and dismantling three existing observatories on the mountain. The three chosen were the CSO, the UKIRT, and the Hoku Keʻa telescope. Two additional telescopes must also be removed by 2033, but those have not been selected as of 1 April 2019.

On April 30, 2009, Caltech announced plans to decommission the CSO, transferring ongoing research to the next-generation Cerro Chajnantor Atacama Telescope (CCAT) in Chile. The plans called for CSO to be dismantled, beginning in 2016, with its site returned to a natural state by 2018. Delays in the environmental assessment and permitting processes have led to postponement of the telescope removal.

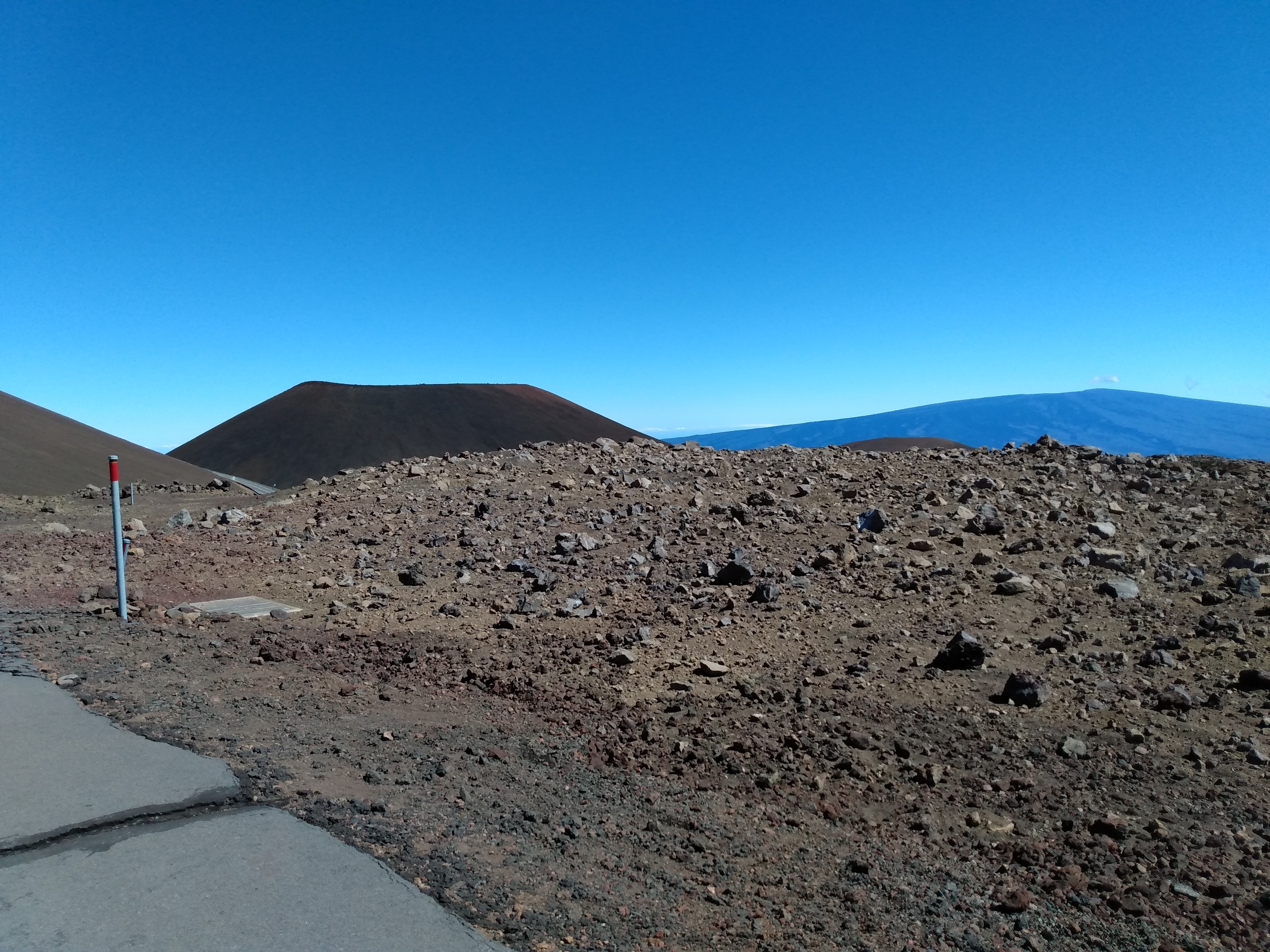
The CSO site after the telescope and dome were removed, and the site was restored.

Disassembly of the Caltech Submillimeter Observatory's (CSO) 34-foot diameter telescope on Maunakea began the week of August 28, 2023. The entire decommissioning process was completed in July 2024 and cost more than $4 million. CSO was the first observatory to be removed under the Decommissioning Plan of the University of Hawaiʻi Maunakea Comprehensive Management Plan.

== See also ==
- Far-infrared astronomy
- List of astronomical observatories
