= Bolocam Galactic Plane Survey =

Astronomical survey

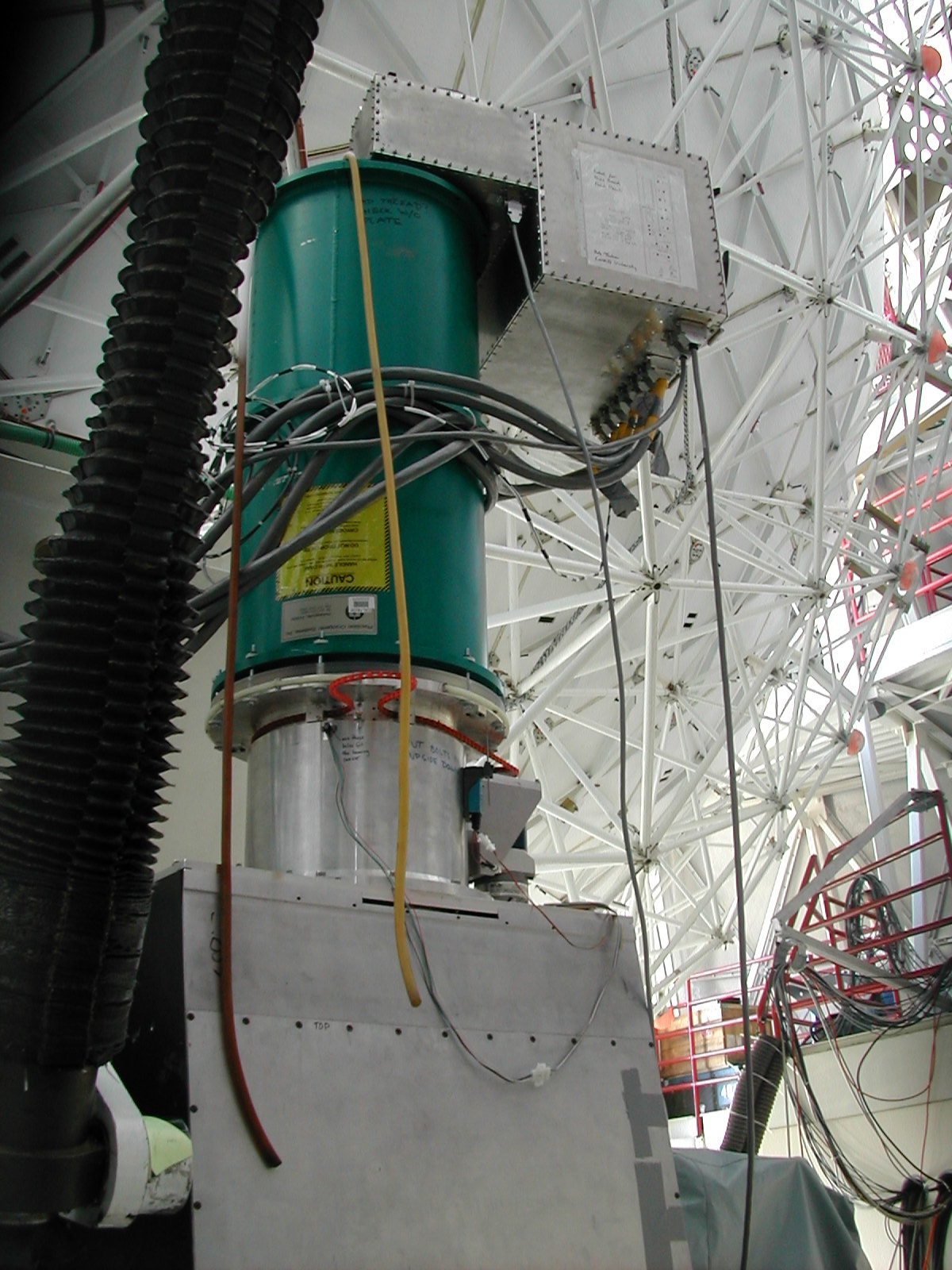
- Bolocam mounted at the Caltech Submillimeter Observatory
- Alternative names: BGPS
- Website: milkyway.colorado.edu/bgps/

Observations for the Bolocam Galactic Plane Survey (BGPS) took place from June 2005 until September 2007 and covers 170 square degrees of the galactic plane visible from the Northern Hemisphere. The survey detected 8400 sources to a limiting non-uniform 1-sigma noise level in the range 30 to 60 mJy/beam. This survey is the first large-area, systematic and uniform survey of the galactic plane in the millimeter continuum. Additional data was acquired in 2009 and released in 2013. All data are currently available from IPAC.

== Survey coverage ==
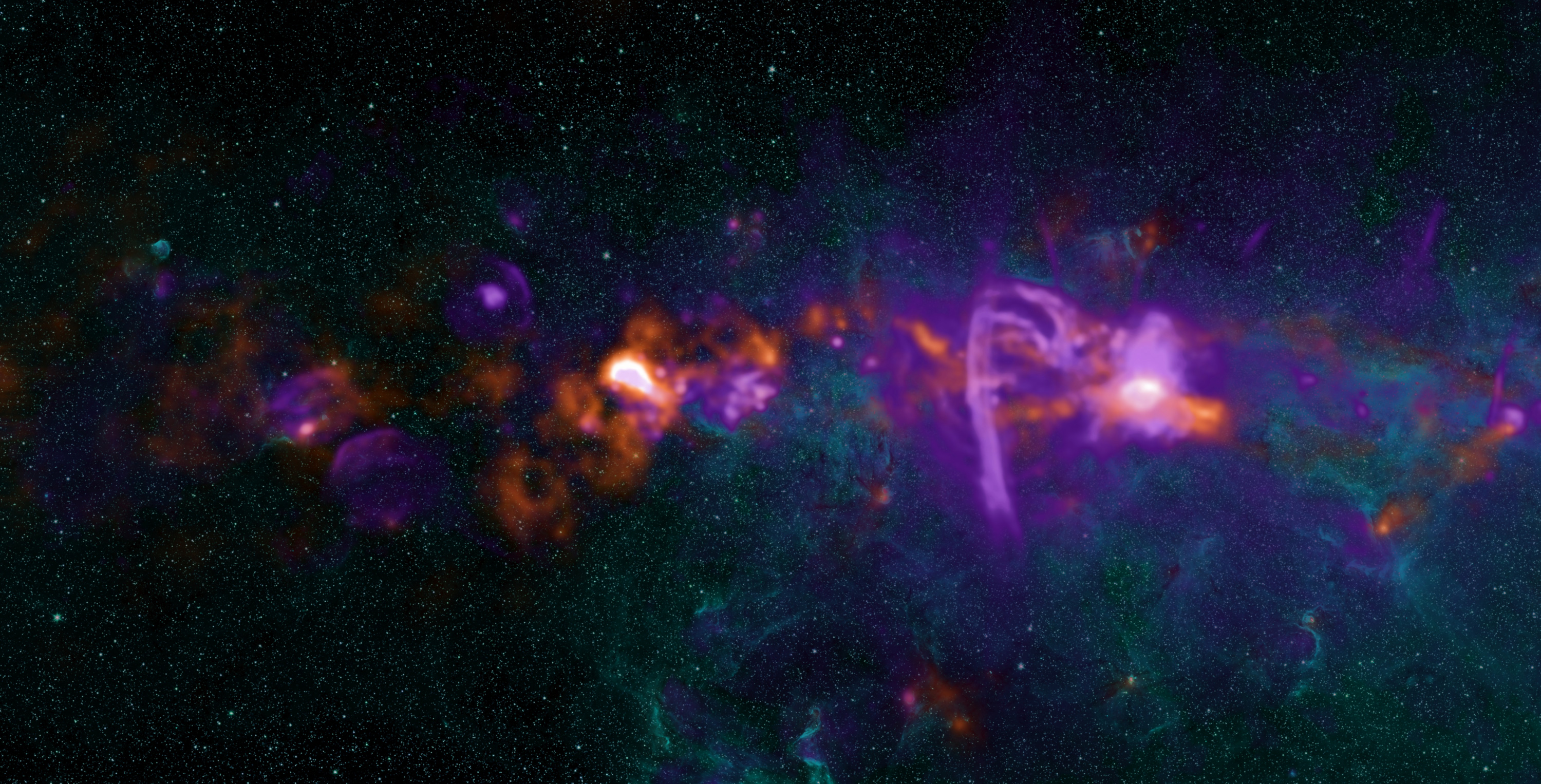
The Galactic Center as seen by Bolocam (orange) from the BGPS, the VLA at 20 cm (purple), and Spitzer at 8 micrometres (cyan).

The survey is contiguous over the range -10.5 ≤ l ≤ 90.5, |b| ≤ 0.5. Towards the Cygnus X spiral arm, the coverage was flared to |b| ≤ 1.5 for 75.5 ≤ l ≤ 87.5. In addition, cross-cuts to |b| ≤ 1.5 were made at l = 3, 15, 30 and 31. The total area of this section is 133 square degrees. With the exception of the increase in latitude, no pre-selection criteria were applied to the coverage in this region. In addition to the contiguous region, four targeted regions in the outer Galaxy were observed: IC1396 (9 square degrees, 97.5 ≤ l ≤ 100.5, 2.25 ≤ l ≤ 5.25), a region towards the Perseus Arm (4 square degrees centered on l = 111, b=0 near NGC7538), W3/4/5 (18 square degrees, 132.5 ≤ l ≤ 138.5) and Gem OB1 (6 square degrees, 187.5 ≤ l ≤ 193.5).
