= James Clerk Maxwell Telescope =

Radio telescope in Hawaii, US

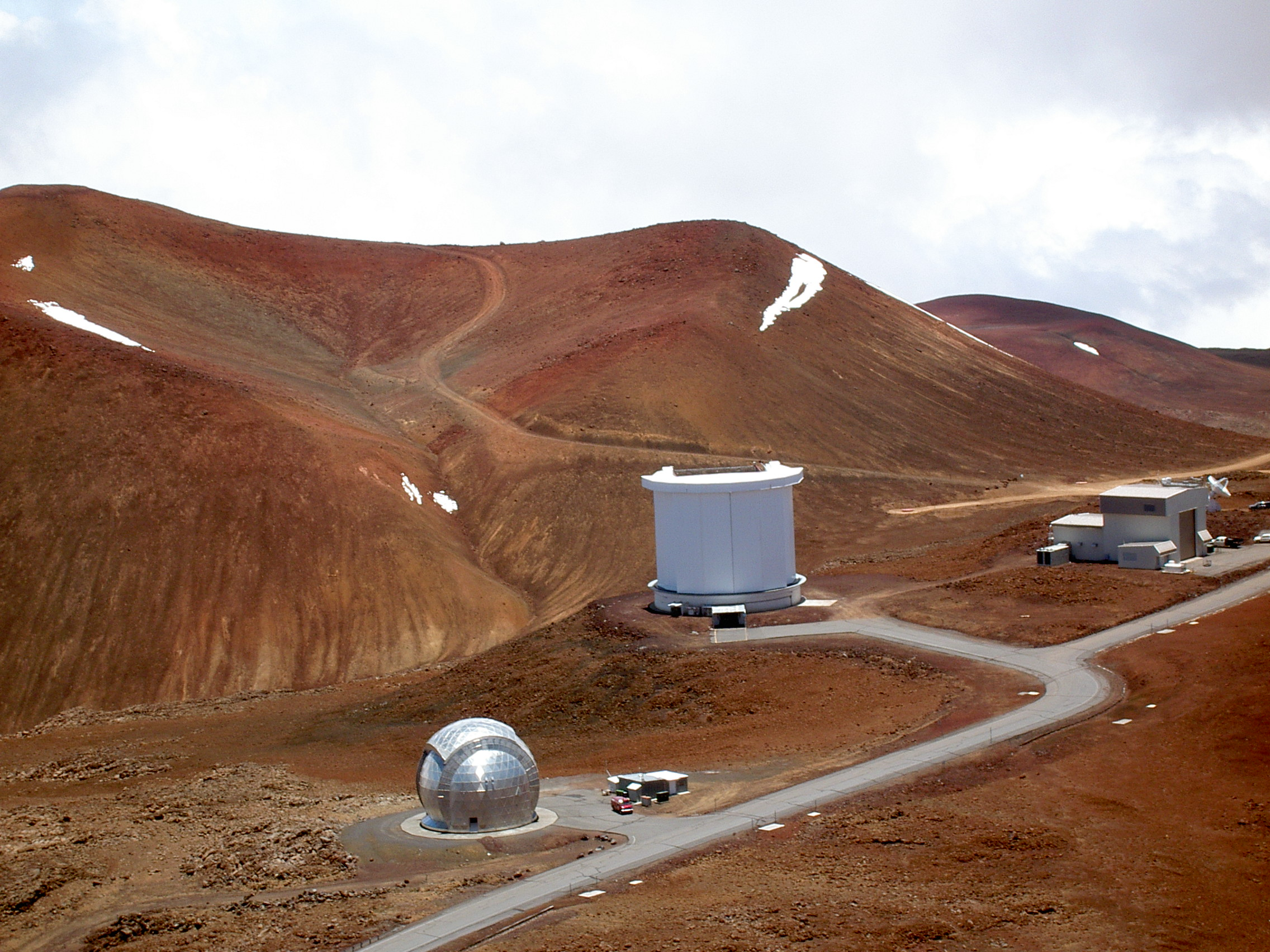
- The JCMT sub-mm telescope in the centre
- Alternative names: JCMT
- Location(s): Maunakea Observatories, Hawaiʻi County, Hawaii
- Coordinates: 19°49′22″N 155°28′37″W
- Altitude: 4,092 m (13,425 ft)
- Website: www.eaobservatory.org/jcmt/
- Location within Hawaii
- Related media on Commons

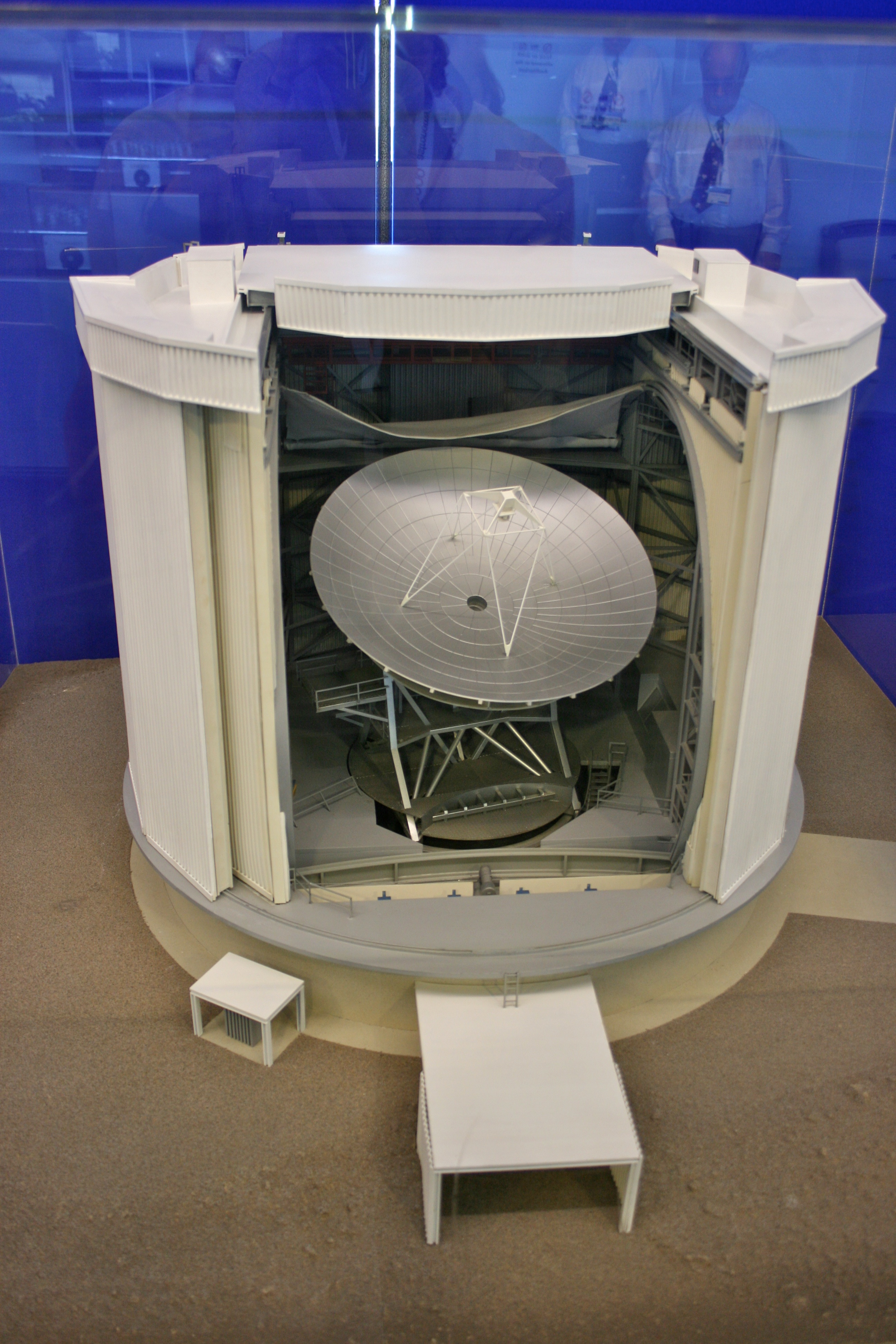
Scale model of JCMT

The James Clerk Maxwell Telescope (JCMT) is a submillimetre-wavelength radio telescope at Mauna Kea Observatory in Hawaii, US. The telescope is near the summit of Mauna Kea at 13,425 feet (4,092 m). Its primary mirror is 15 metres (16.4 yards) across: it is the largest single-dish telescope that operates in submillimetre wavelengths of the electromagnetic spectrum (far-infrared to microwave). Scientists use it to study the Solar System, interstellar dust and gas, and distant galaxies.

The JCMT started operations in 1987, and was funded until February 2015 by a partnership between the United Kingdom and Canada, and the Netherlands. It was operated by the Joint Astronomy Centre and was named in honour of mathematical physicist James Clerk Maxwell. In March 2015 the operation of the JCMT was taken over by the East Asian Observatory. Funding is provided by the National Astronomical Observatory of China, National Astronomical Observatory of Japan, Korea Astronomy and Space Science Institute, and the Academia Sinica Institute of Astronomy and Astrophysics of Taiwan.

The telescope was combined with the Caltech Submillimeter Observatory next to it to form the first submillimetre astronomical interferometer. This success was important driving the construction of the later Submillimeter Array and the Atacama Large Millimeter Array (ALMA) interferometers.

In recent years the JCMT has also taken part in Event Horizon Telescope observations, which produced the first direct image of a black hole. The JCMT was also involved in the discovery of phosphine, a potential biomarker, in the atmosphere of Venus.

== History ==
In the late 1960s, the Astronomy Committee of the UK's Science Research Council (SRC, the forerunner of STFC) considered the importance of astronomical observations at submillimetre and millimetre wavelengths. After a series of proposals and debates, in 1975, the SRC millimetre steering committee concluded that it would be possible to construct a 15-metre diameter telescope capable of observing at wavelengths down to 750–800 μm. The project, then called the National New Technology Telescope (NNTT), was to be an 80/20 per cent collaboration with the Netherlands Organisation for the Advancement of Science. Site tests were made at Mauna Kea in Hawaii, the Pinaleno Mountains in Arizona, and a site in Chile; and Mauna Kea was chosen. The NNTT was to be larger and with more instruments than competing telescopes such as the CSO and SMT.

The final specifications called for the "world's largest telescope optimised for submillimetre wavelengths". It was to be a parabolic 15-metre antenna composed of 276 individually adjustable panels with a surface accuracy of better than 50 μm. It would be an altitude-azimuth mounted Cassegrain telescope with a tertiary mirror to direct the incoming radiation onto a number of different receivers. The antenna and mountings were to be protected from the elements by a co-rotating carousel with a transparent membrane stretched across the carousel aperture. Building work started in 1983 and went well.

In 1984, the telescope was shipped from England to Hawaii. After the original shipper broke down at the last minute, the telescope was given to a commercial captain who was supposed to deliver it directly to Hawaii. Instead, the captain sailed to Holland to pick up a shipment of explosives, then was delayed at the Panama Canal, allegedly because special clearance was needed to transport the explosives through the canal. The captain then delivered the explosives to Ecuador before finally reaching Hawaii. Waiting just outside of territorial waters, the captain demanded that the late delivery charges—now almost equal to that of the shipping charges—be waived, and threatened to throw the telescope overboard if his demand was not met. The telescope team was able to get a court order to give up the board, and the ship was subsequently boarded and the captain arrested at gunpoint by the Coast Guard. The telescope saw first light in 1987. The name for the final facility was changed to the James Clerk Maxwell Telescope.

The telescope itself was operated by the Joint Astronomy Centre (JAC), from Hilo, Hawaii. From 1987 until March 2013 the telescope was funded by a partnership of the United Kingdom (55 per cent), Canada (25 per cent), and the Netherlands (20 per cent). In 2013 the Netherlands withdrew, and until 2015 the shares became UK 75 per cent, Canada 25 per cent. In March 2015, the UK and Canada handed over ownership of the JCMT to the East Asian Observatory, which is funded by Japan, China, Taiwan and South Korea, together with a consortium of Universities from the United Kingdom and Canada.

== Instrumentation ==
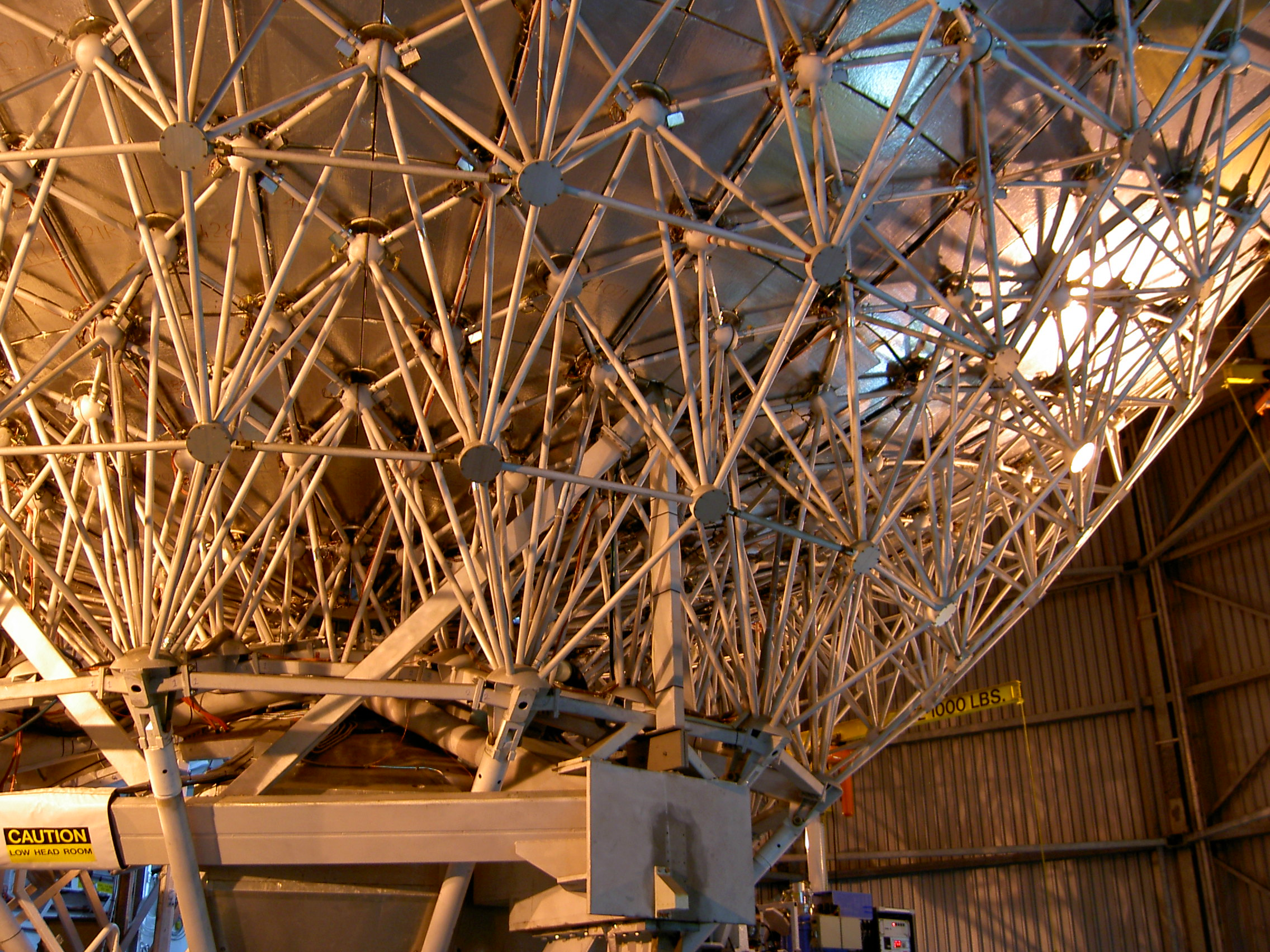
The primary mirror seen from behind, showing the construction from many panels

The JCMT has two kinds of instruments: broadband continuum receivers and heterodyne detection spectral line receivers.

Continuum emission is a tracer of star formation in other galaxies and gives astronomers clues to the presence, distance, and evolution history of galaxies other than our own. Within our own galaxy dust emission is associated with stellar nurseries and planet forming star systems.

Spectral-line observations can be used to identify particular molecules in molecular clouds, study their distribution and chemistry and determine gas velocity gradients across astronomical objects (because of the doppler effect).

=== SCUBA ===
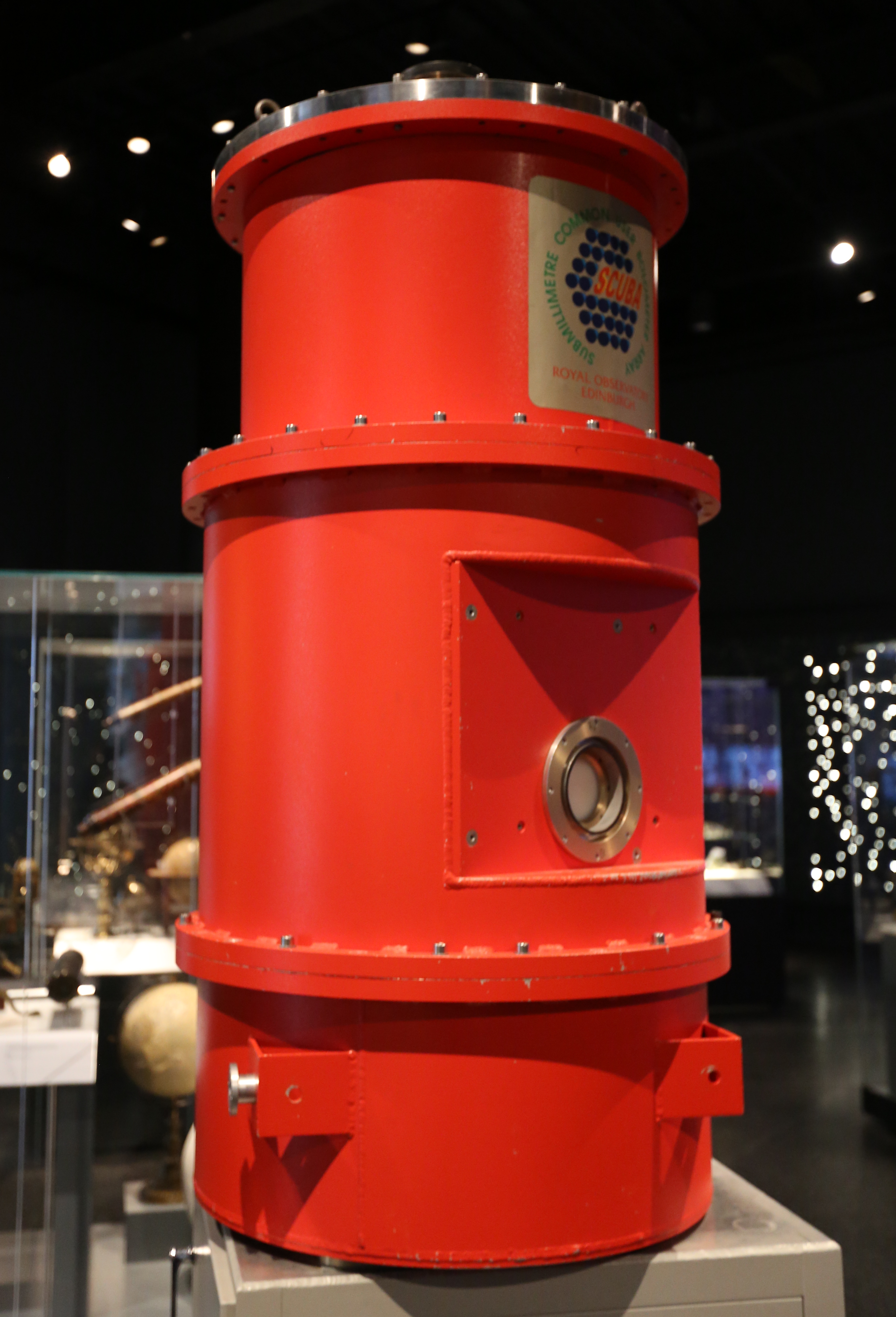
The Submillimetre Common-User Bolometer Array

The older continuum single pixel UKT14 bolometer receiver was replaced around 1995 by the Submillimetre Common-User Bolometer Array (SCUBA). This instrument operated simultaneously at wavelengths of 450 and 850 micron (with 91 and 37 pixels, respectively), and was sensitive to the thermal emission from interstellar dust. SCUBA was a ground-breaking instrument, among the most high-impact astronomy instruments from 1997 to 2003; it was retired from service in 2005, and is now in the National Museum of Scotland.

=== SCUBA-2 ===
SCUBA was succeeded by SCUBA-2, which was commissioned in 2011. This ground-breaking camera consists of large arrays of superconducting transition edge sensors with a mapping speed hundreds of times larger than SCUBA. It has 5120 array elements at both 450 and 850 micron wavelength (10,240 total pixels). It has been conducting the JCMT legacy surveys since November, 2011, including the SCUBA-2 All Sky Survey, and was made available for general astronomical observations in February, 2012. Two ancillary instruments, FTS-2 and POL-2, add spectroscopic and polarimetric capabilities to SCUBA-2.

=== Spectral line detectors ===
The JCMT is also equipped with two heterodyne receivers, which allow submillimetre spectral line observations to be made. The spectral-line mapping capabilities of the JCMT have been greatly enhanced by the commissioning in 2006 of HARP, a 350 GHz, 16 element heterodyne array receiver. Both instruments can be used in conjunction with the JCMT's new digital autocorrelation spectrometer, ACSIS. One of the heterodyne receivers is named Namakanui ("Big-Eyes"), referring to big-eyed fish that swim in Hawaiian waters at night. This receiver can operate at 86, 230, and 345 GHz.

== See also ==
- Far infrared astronomy
- Radio astronomy
- SCUBA-2 All Sky Survey
- Submillimetre astronomy
