= Submillimeter Array =

Astronomical radio interferometer in Hawaii, USA

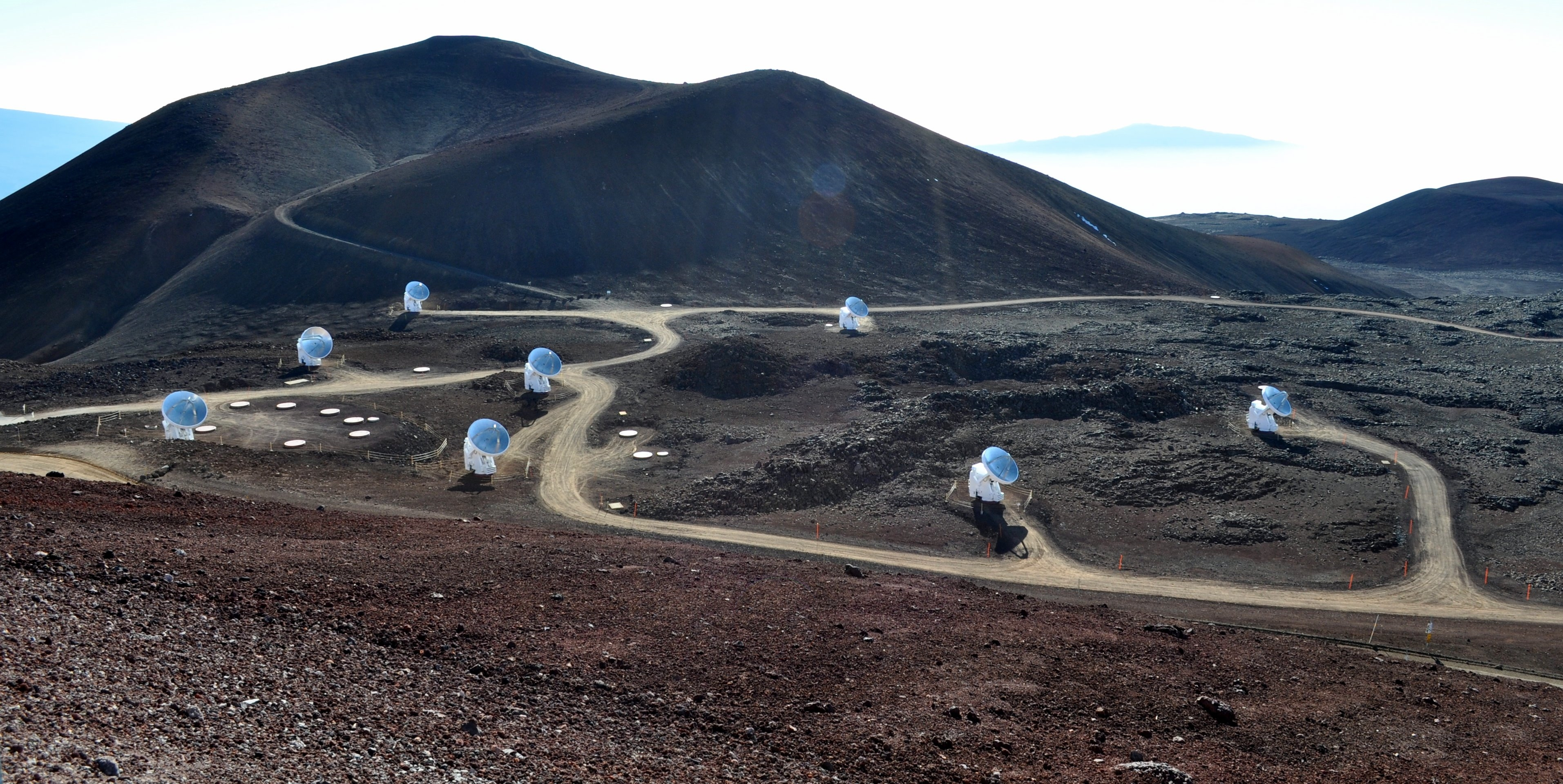
- The Submillimeter Array

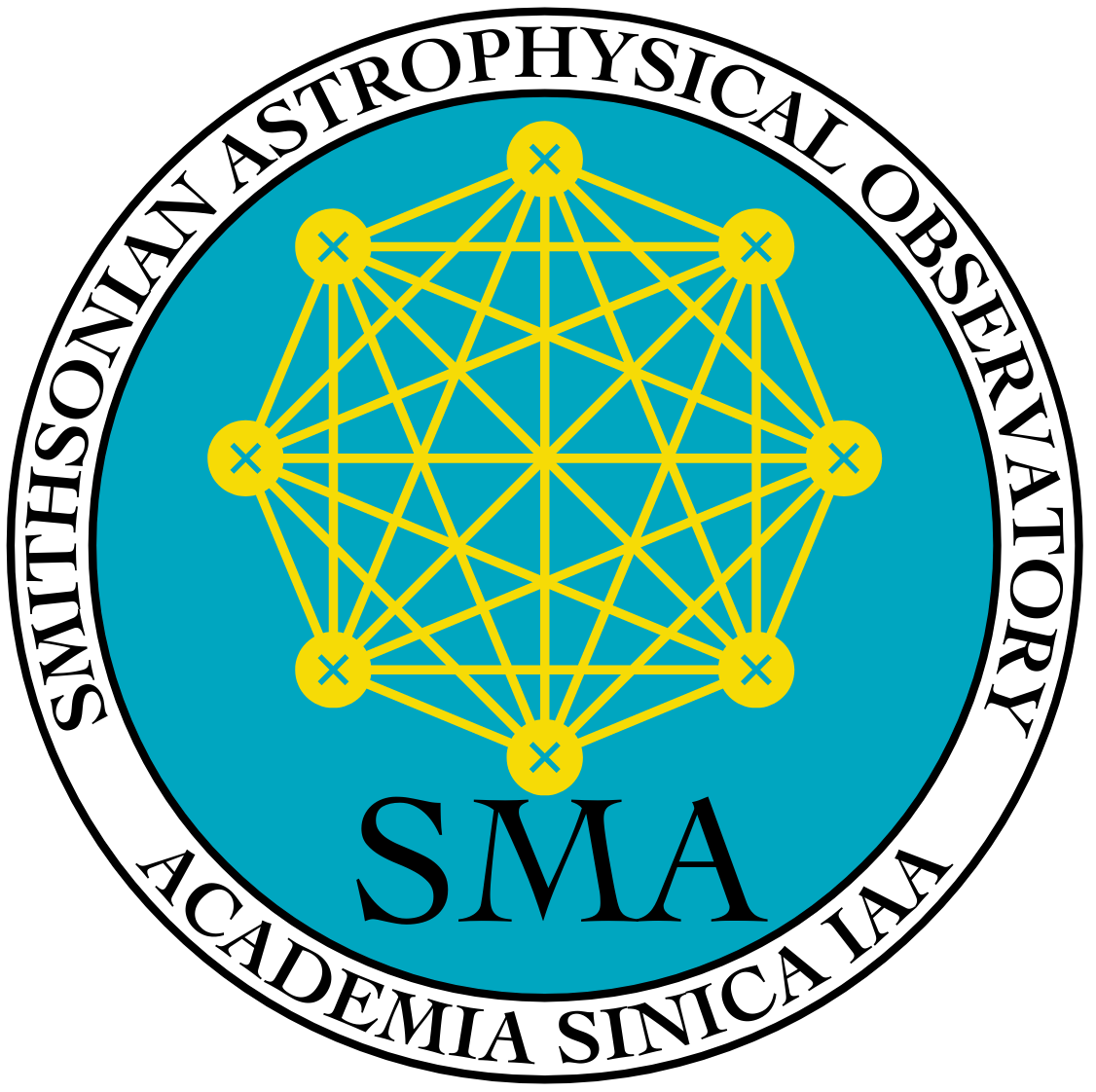
- Location: Hawaiʻi County, Hawaii
- Coordinates: 19°49′27″N 155°28′41″W
- Altitude: 4,080 m (13,390 ft)
- Wavelength: 0.717 mm (418 GHz)–1.67 mm (180 GHz)
- Telescope style: radio interferometer
- Number of telescopes: 8
- Diameter: 6 m (19 ft 8 in)
- Website: www.cfa.harvard.edu/sma/
- Location within Hawaii
- Related media on Commons

The Submillimeter Array (SMA) consists of eight 6-meter (20 ft) diameter radio telescopes arranged as an interferometer for submillimeter wavelength observations. It is the first purpose-built submillimeter interferometer, constructed after successful interferometry experiments using the pre-existing 15-meter (49 ft) James Clerk Maxwell Telescope and 10.4-meter (34.1 ft) Caltech Submillimeter Observatory (now decommissioned) as an interferometer. All three of these observatories are located at Mauna Kea Observatory on Mauna Kea, Hawaii, and have been operated together as a ten element interferometer in the 230 and 345 GHz bands (eSMA, for extended Submillimeter Array). The baseline lengths presently in use range from 16 to 508 meters (52 to 1,667 ft). The radio frequencies accessible to this telescope range from 194–408 gigahertz (1.545–0.735 mm) which includes rotational transitions of dozens of molecular species as well as continuum emission from interstellar dust grains. Although the array is capable of operating both day and night, most of the observations take place at nighttime when the atmospheric phase stability is best.

The SMA is jointly operated by the Smithsonian Astrophysical Observatory (SAO) and the Academia Sinica Institute of Astronomy and Astrophysics (ASIAA).

== History ==
The SMA project was begun in 1983 as part of a broad initiative by Irwin Shapiro, the then new director of the SAO, to produce high resolution astronomical instruments across the electromagnetic spectrum. Initially the design called for an array consisting of six antennas, but in 1996 ASIAA joined the project and funded the construction of two additional antennas and the expansion of the correlator to accommodate the near doubling of the number of interferometer baselines. Sites considered for the array included Mount Graham in Arizona, a location near the South Pole, and the Atacama Desert in Chile, but Mauna Kea was ultimately chosen due to its existing infrastructure, the availability of a fairly flat area for array construction, and the potential to include the JCMT and CSO in the array. A receiver laboratory was established at the SAO's Cambridge location in 1987.

The antennas were constructed at Haystack Observatory in Westford, Massachusetts, partially disassembled and trucked across the United States, then shipped by sea to Hawaii. The antennas were reassembled in a large hangar at the Mauna Kea summit site.

The SMA was dedicated and began official operations on November 22, 2003.

== Array Design ==
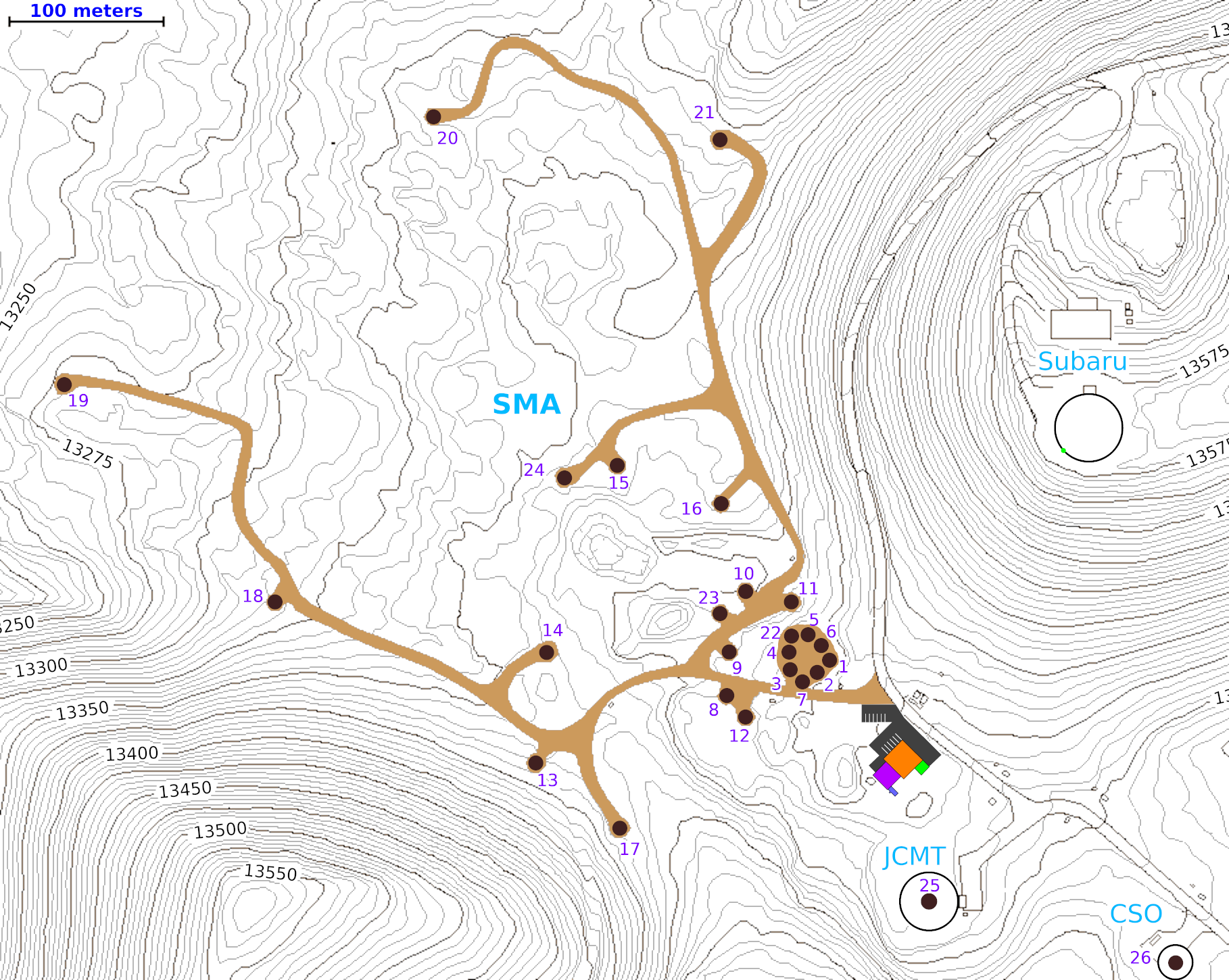
The layout of the SMA is shown on a topographic map

The SMA was built just northwest of the saddle between the cinder cones Pu'u Poli'ahu and Pu'u Hauoki, about 140 meters below the summit of Mauna Kea.

A perennial issue for radio interferometers, especially those with a small number of antennas, is where the antennas should be placed relative to each other, in order to produce the best synthesized images. In 1996 Eric Keto studied this problem for the SMA. He found that the most uniform sampling of spatial frequencies, and thus the cleanest (lowest sidelobe) point spread function was obtained when the antennas were arranged in the shape of a Reuleaux triangle. Because of that study, pads upon which SMA antennas can be placed were arranged to form four Reuleaux triangles, with the easternmost pad forming a shared corner for all four triangles. However the SMA site is a lava field with many rocky ridges and depressions, so the pads could not be placed in exactly the optimal positions.

In most cases all eight antennas are deployed on the pads forming one Reuleaux triangle, leading to four configurations named, in order of increasing size, subcompact, compact, extended and very extended. The schedule of antenna moves is determined by the requirements of the approved observing proposals, but tends to follow a roughly quarterly schedule. A custom-built transporter vehicle is used to lift an antenna off of a pad, drive it along one of the dirt access roads, and place it on a new pad while maintaining power to the cooling system for the cryogenic receivers.

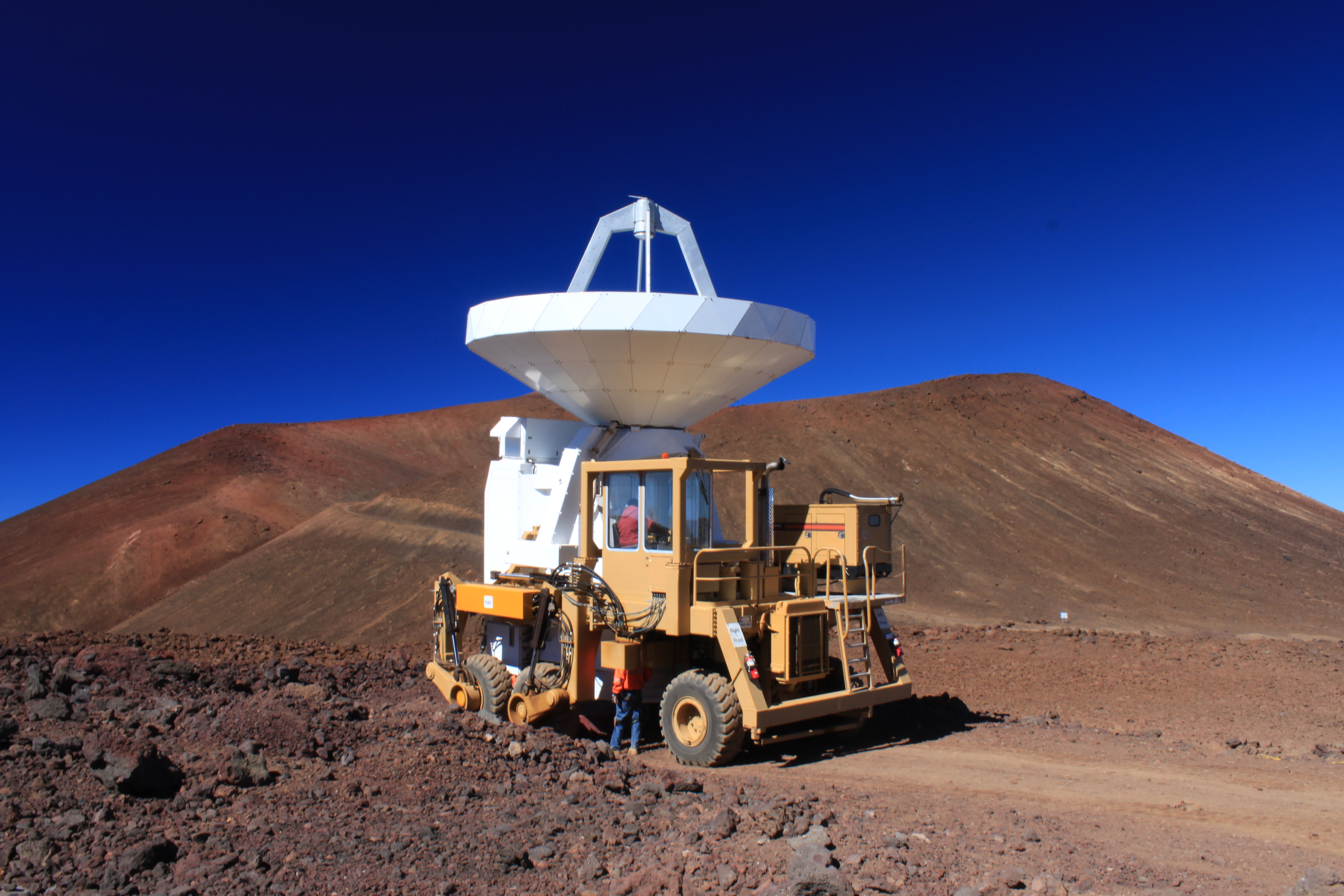
An SMA antenna in the observatory's transporter being moved to a new pad

Each antenna pad has a conduit connecting it to the central building, through which AC power cables, and optical fibers are pulled. Multi-mode optical fibers are used for low bandwidth digital signals, such as ethernet and phone service. Sumitomo LTCD single-mode fiber optic cables are used for the reference signals to generate the LO for the heterodyne receivers and the return of the IF signal from the antenna. The Sumitomo fibers have an extremely low coefficient of thermal expansion, which is nearly zero at the typical temperature below the surface of Mauna Kea. This allows the array to operate without closed-loop delay measurements.

== Antennas ==
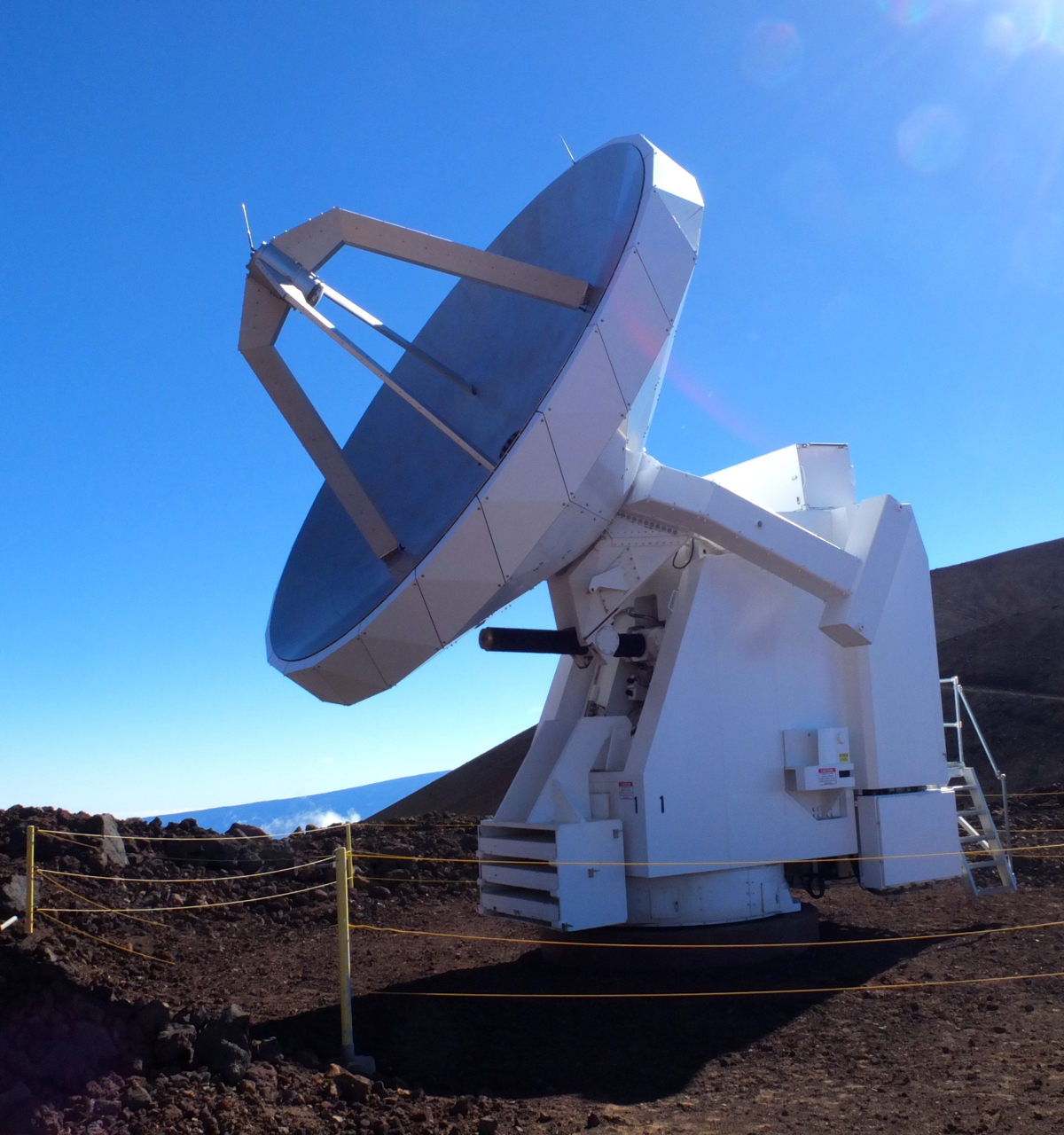
An SMA antenna deployed on a pad

Each of the eight antennas has a 6 meter diameter primary mirror made of 72 machined cast aluminum panels. Machined aluminum was chosen over the lighter carbon fiber alternative, because of concerns that heavy snow accumulation, or windblown volcanic dust, might damage fragile carbon fiber panels. The panels, each about 1 meter wide, were machined to an accuracy of 6 microns. They are supported by a carbon fiber tube backup structure, which is enclosed by aluminum panels to protect it from windblown debris. The positions of the panels can be adjusted from the front of the dish.

The initial adjustment of the surface panels in Hawaii was done in the service hangar, using a rotating template. After the antennas were deployed, the surfaces were measured using near-field holography with a 232.4 GHz beacon source mounted on the exterior cat-walk of the Subaru building, 67 meters above the SMA's subcompact pad ring. The panel positions were adjusted based on the holography results, and holography guided adjustments are repeated periodically, to maintain the surface quality. After several rounds of adjustment, the surface's error is typically about 15 microns RMS.

Heating units are installed on the primary mirror, the stand supporting the secondary mirror, and the secondary mirror itself, in order to prevent ice formation in high humidity conditions.

Each antenna has a cabin holding the electronics needed to control the antenna, as well as the Nasmyth focus receivers. This temperature-controlled cabin nearly encloses the antenna's steel mount to minimize pointing errors due to thermal changes.

== Receivers ==
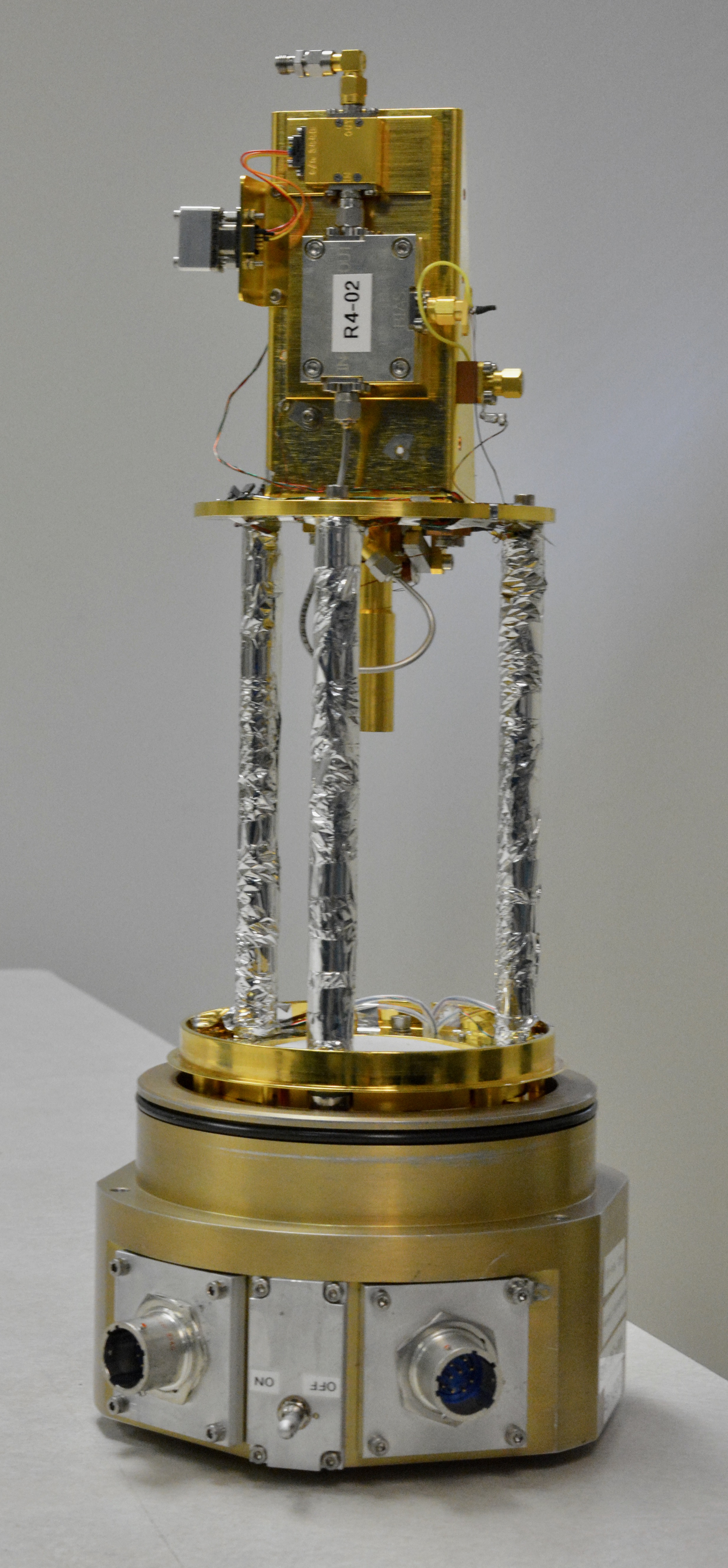
An SMA receiver insert, covering frequencies from 194 to 240 GHz. The large cryostat in each antenna can house up to eight inserts.

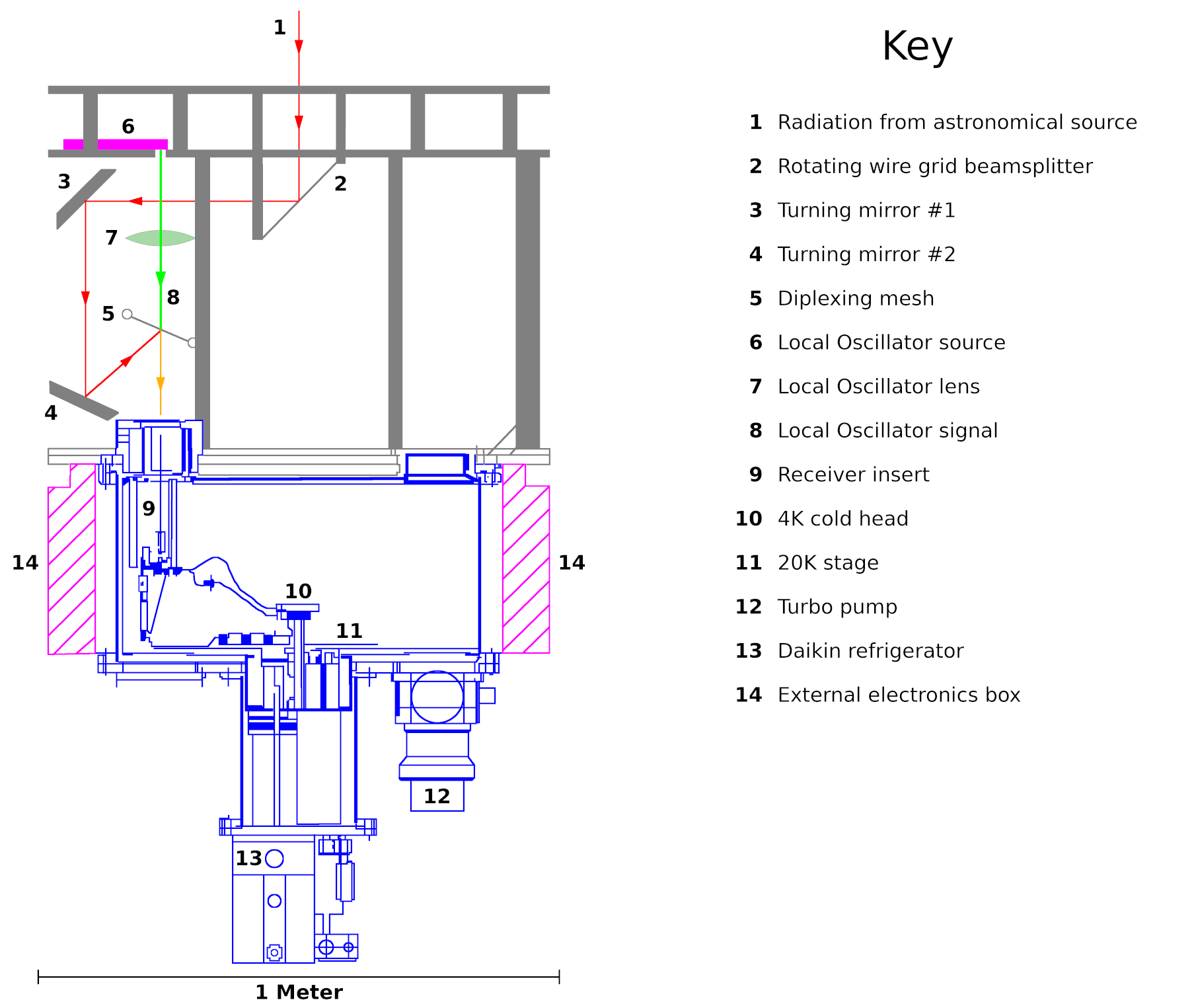
Cutaway diagram of an SMA receiver cryostat showing the signal path

The SMA uses cryogenic SIS heterodyne receivers, at a bent Nasmyth focus. All receivers are mounted in a single large cryostat within the antenna cabin. The cryostat can accommodate up to eight receiver inserts, each of which holds a single receiver. A rotating wire grid beam splitter followed by a rotating mirror directs the two linear polarizations of the incoming radiation to two of the receiver inserts. This allows the array to observe either a single polarization of two different frequency bands simultaneously, or both polarizations of a single band simultaneously to improve sensitivity and measure Stokes parameters.

Receivers are available to cover frequencies from 194 to 408 GHz, without gaps. However full polarization measurements can only be made around 230 and 345 GHz, where pairs of receivers can be tuned to the same frequency, and quarter wave plates optimized for those frequencies can be inserted into the optical path.

The receivers are sensitive to both sidebands produced by the heterodyne mixing. The sidebands are separated by introducing a Walsh pattern of 90 degree phase changes in the LO signal, and demodulating that pattern within the correlator. A Walsh pattern of 180 degree phase changes, unique to each antenna, is also introduced to the LO, in order to suppress cross talk between the IFs arriving at the correlator from different antennas.

Thanks to the recent wideband update of the SMA receivers, with two receivers tuned to frequencies offset by 12 GHz, the array can observe a 44 GHz wide interval of sky frequencies without gaps.

== Correlator ==
The original SMA correlator was designed to correlate 2 GHz of IF bandwidth per sideband from each of two active receivers in eight antennas, producing spectral data for 28 baselines. Because the analog-to-digital converters sampled at 208 MHz, the IF was downconverted into 24 partially overlapping "chunks", each 104 MHz wide, before sampling. After sampling, the data were sent to 90 large PC boards, each of which held 32 ASIC correlator chips. The correlator was an XF design; in the default configuration 6144 lags were calculated for each of two receivers on 28 baselines, before an FFT was applied to convert the lag data to spectra. In the default configuration the spectral resolution was 812.5 kHz per channel, but the correlator could be reconfigured to increase the spectral resolution on certain chunks, at the expense of lower resolution elsewhere in the spectrum. The correlator chips were designed at MIT Haystack, and funded by five institutions: SMA, USNO, NASA, NRFA and JIVE. The correlator could also be configured to correlate all 45 baselines produced by adding the CSO and JCMT to the array, but only for a single receiver per antenna.

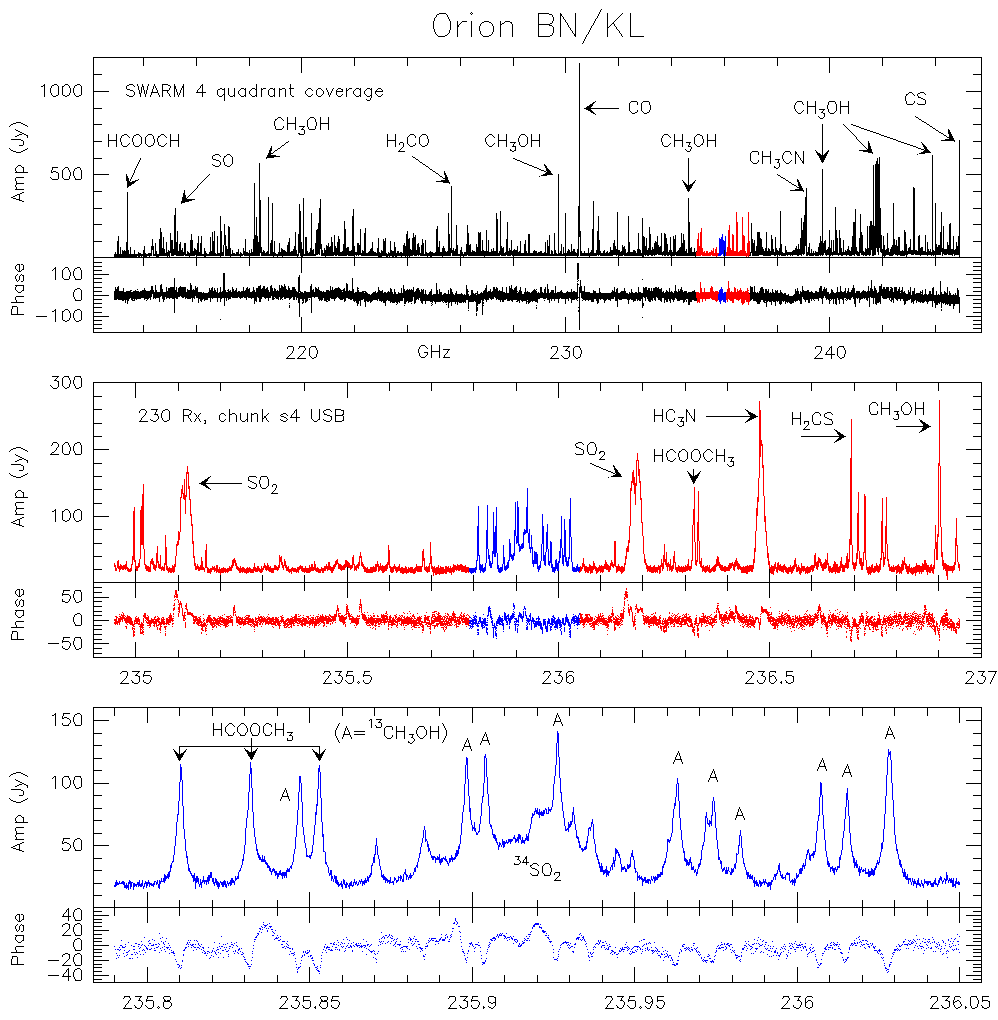
A spectrum produced by the SWARM correlator when the SMA observed Orion BN/KL in 2016. This spectrum was produced when only four quadrants of SWARM were available. Six quadrants are available now.

In 2016 a new correlator called SWARM was brought online, allowing more total IF bandwidth to be correlated, increasing the array's sensitivity to continuum sources as well as its instantaneous spectral coverage. The new correlator, an FX design, uses 4.576 GHz analog-to-digital converters and Xilinx Virtex-6 SX475T FPGAs rather than purpose-built correlator chips. The FPGAs are housed with additional electronics on ROACH2 boards produced by the Collaboration for Astronomy Signal Processing and Electronics Research (CASPER). The new correlator operates at only one spectral configuration, uniform 140 kHz per channel resolution across the entire bandwidth. The data are stored at this high spectral resolution even for projects that require only low resolution, so that the highest resolution will be retained in the observatory's data archive for use in later research. Each quadrant of the correlator can process 2 GHz of IF bandwidth per sideband for two active receivers in all eight antennas. When the two receivers are tuned to the same frequency, full Stokes polarization parameters are calculated. Somewhat confusingly, there are now six SWARM "quadrants" in the full correlator, allowing 12 GHz of bandwidth to be correlated for each sideband of two receivers on all baselines, allowing a 48 GHz total sky frequency coverage.

SWARM can also operate as a phased array summer, making the SMA appear to be a single antenna for VLBI operations.

== Science with the SMA ==
The SMA is a multi-purpose instrument which can be used to observe diverse celestial phenomena. The SMA excels at observations of dust and gas with temperatures only a few tens of kelvins above absolute zero. Objects with such temperatures typically emit the bulk of their radiation at wavelengths between a few hundred micrometers and a few millimeters, which is the wavelength range in which the SMA can observe. Commonly observed classes of objects include star-forming molecular clouds in our own and other galaxies, highly redshifted galaxies, evolved stars, and the Galactic Center. Occasionally, bodies in the Solar System, such as planets, asteroids, comets and moons, are observed.

The SMA has been used to discover that Pluto is 10 K (18 °F) cooler than expected. It was the first radio telescope to resolve Pluto and Charon as separate objects.

The SMA is a part of the Event Horizon Telescope, which observes nearby supermassive black holes with an angular resolution comparable to the size of the object's event horizon and which produced the first image of a black hole.

== Gallery ==
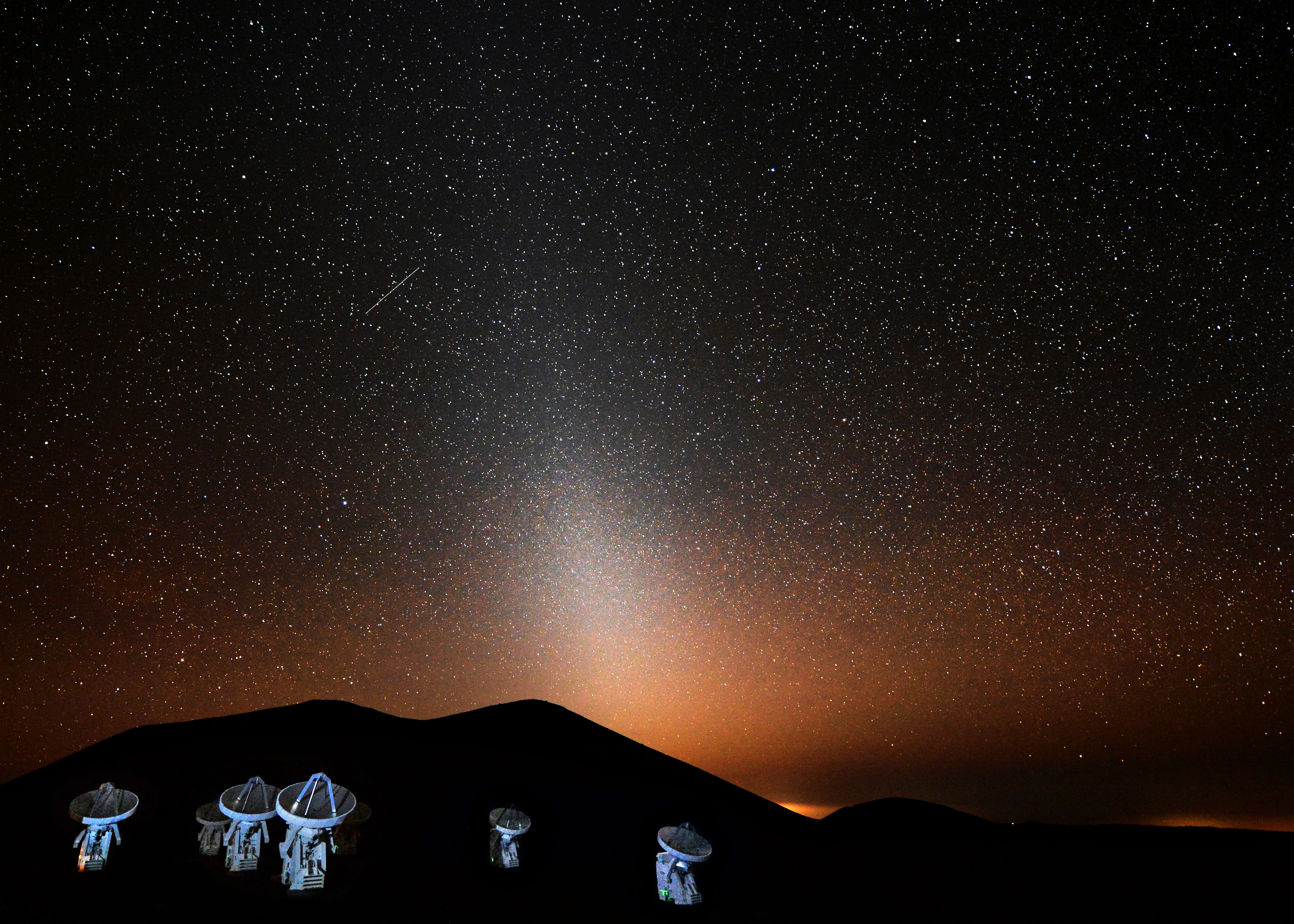
The Submillimeter Array at night in 2015, lit by flash

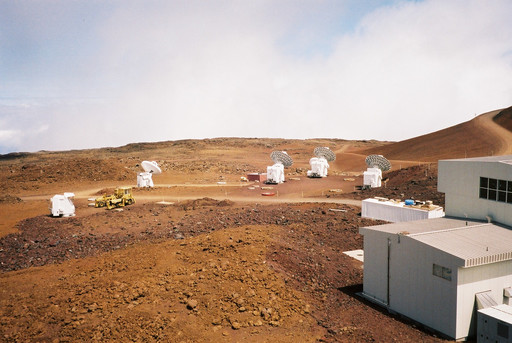
The Array under construction in 2002

== See also ==
- Atacama Large Millimeter Array, currently operating in Chile
