= NGC 4452 =

Lenticular galaxy in the constellation Virgo

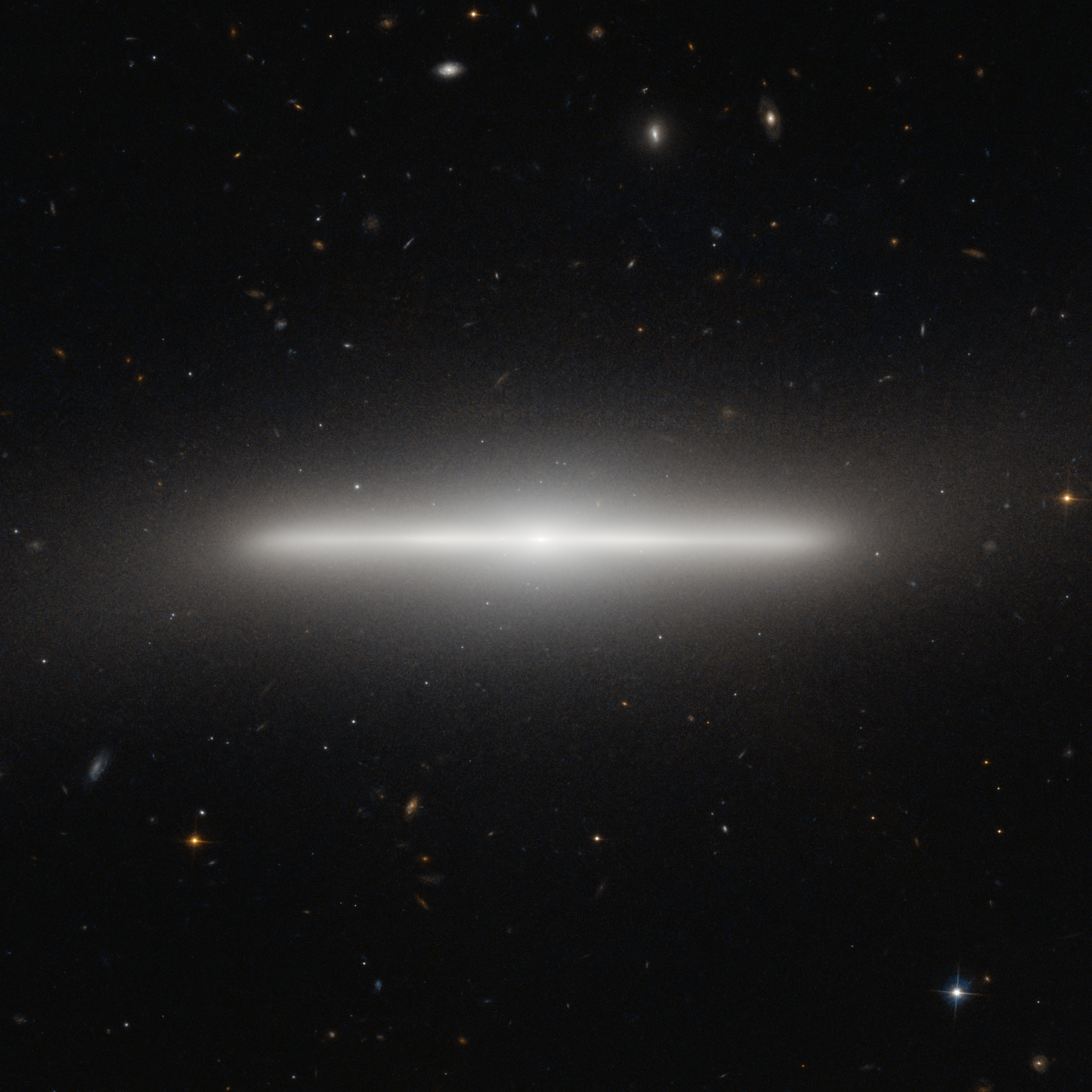
- NGC 4452 by Hubble Space Telescope

Observation data (J2000 epoch)
- Constellation: Virgo
- Right ascension: 12^{h} 28.7^{m} 00^{s}
- Declination: +11° 45′ 00″
- Redshift: 0.000540
- Distance: 18.5 Mpc (60 Mly)
- Group or cluster: Virgo
- Apparent magnitude (V): 12.4

Characteristics
- Type: S
- Apparent size (V): 2.7' × 36" (35 kly (11 kpc) in diameter)

Other designations
- NGC 4452, 2MFGC 9831, VCC 1125, [CHM2007] LDC 904 J122843.62+1145261, ACSVCS 44, 2MFGC 9833, VPC 613, [CHM2007] HDC 720 J122843.62+1145261, LEDA 41060, UGC 7601, Z 1226.2+1202, MCG+02-32-080, UZC J122843.3+114519, Z 70–112

NGC 4452 is an edge-on lenticular galaxy that is part of the Virgo Cluster. NGC 4452 is about 60 million light-years (18 Mpc) away from Earth and 35 kly (11 kpc) in diameter. This galaxy was first seen by William Herschel in 1784 with his 47 cm (19 in) telescope.

NGC 4452 is so thin that it is actually difficult to determine what type of disk galaxy it is. Its lack of a visible dust lane indicates that it is a low-dust lenticular galaxy, although it is still possible that a view from on top would reveal spiral structure. The unusual stellar line segment spans about 35,000 light-years from end to end.

Near NGC 4452's center is a slight bulge of stars, while hundreds of background galaxies are visible far in the distance. Galaxies that appear this thin are rare mostly because Earth must reside (nearly) in the extrapolated planes of their thin galactic disks. Galaxies that actually are this thin are relatively common; for example, the Milky Way Galaxy is thought to be about this thin.

NGC 4452 appears to be very similar to galaxy IC 335, an edge-on galaxy in Fornax Cluster, in constellation Fornax.
