= Galactic plane =

Plane on which most of a disk-shaped galaxy's mass lies

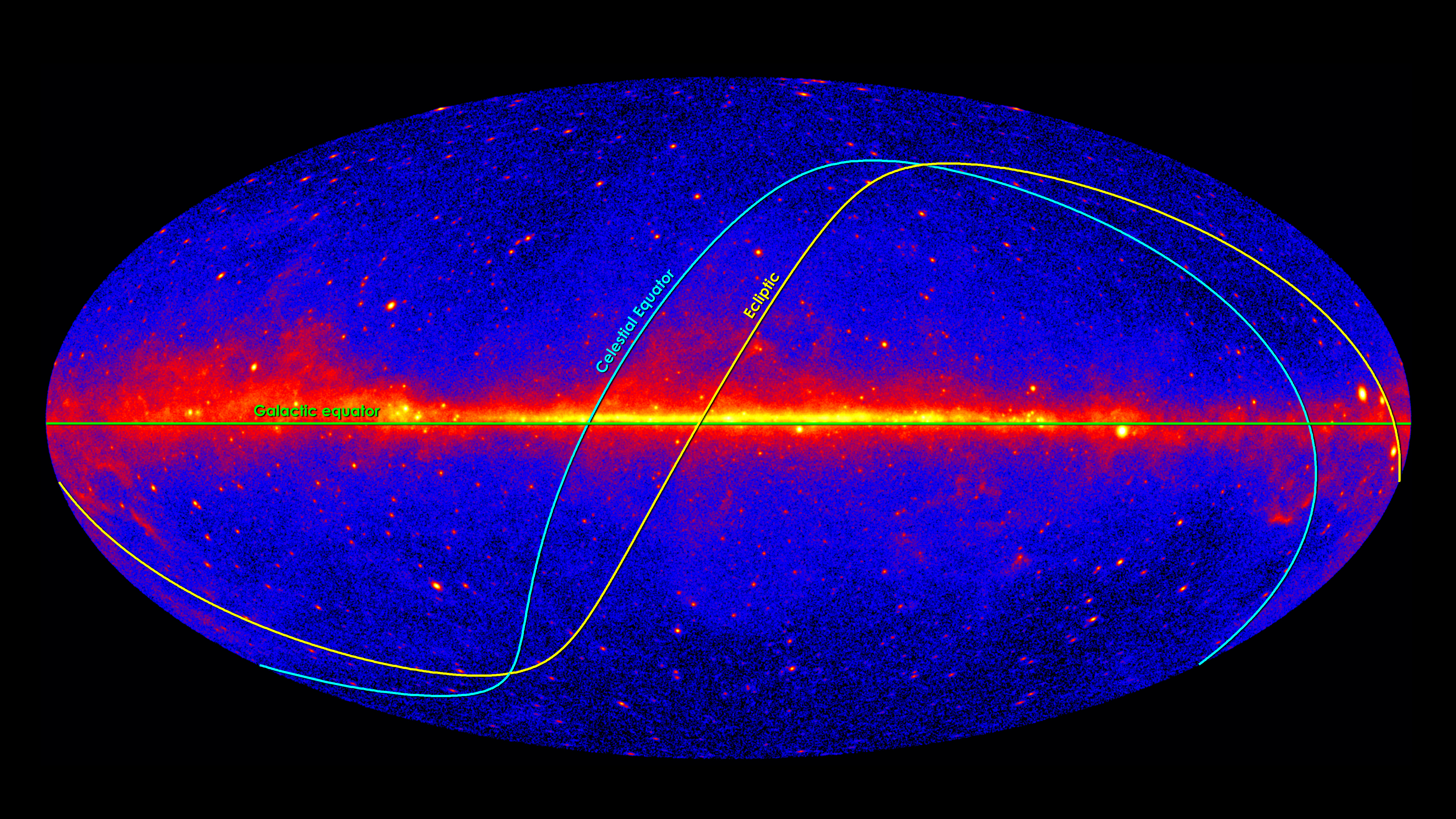
Milky Way with galactic plane, ecliptic and celestial equator.

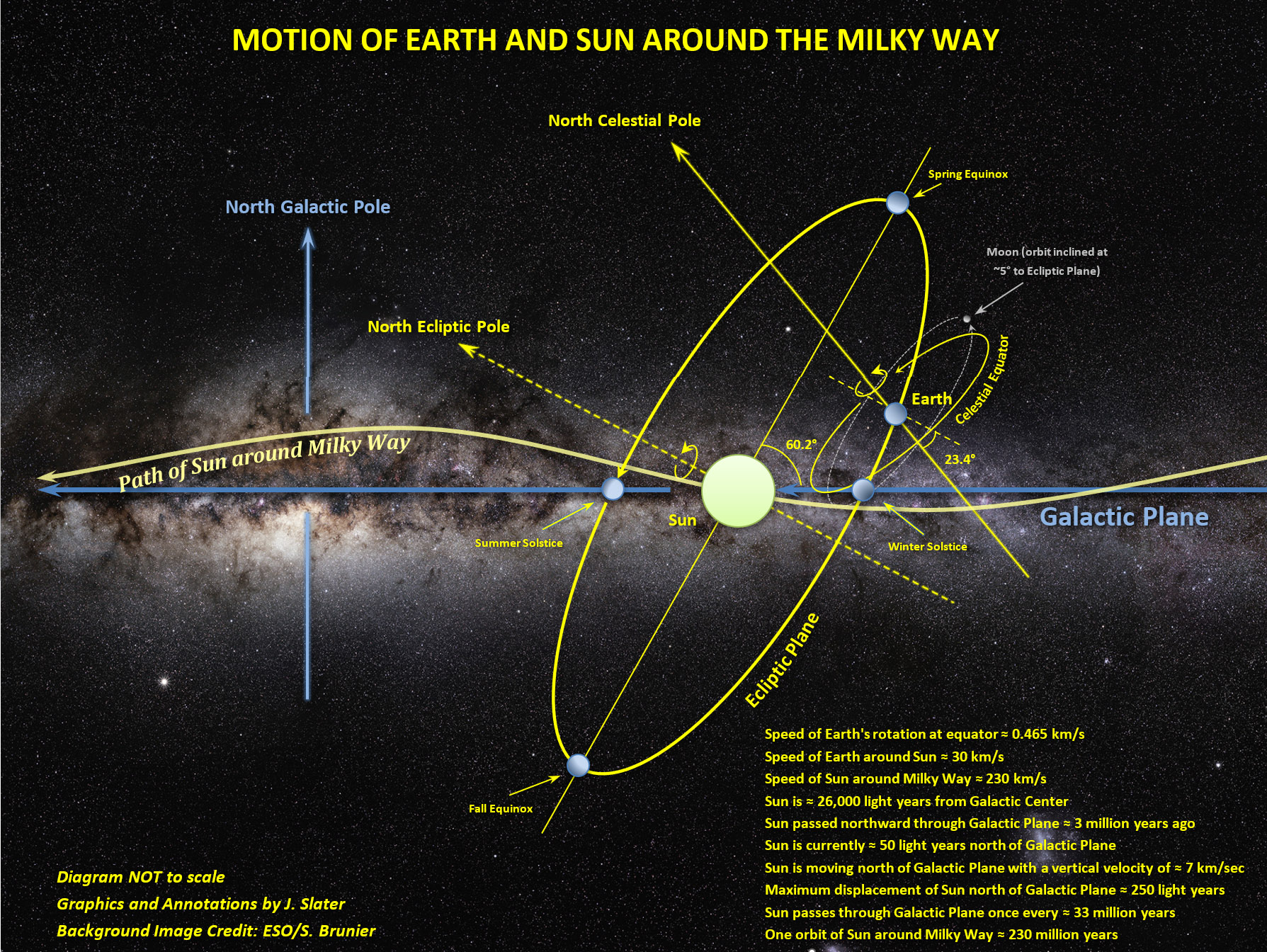
Galactic plane in relation to the celestial and ecliptic planes

The galactic plane is the plane on which most of a disk-shaped galaxy's mass lies. The directions perpendicular to the galactic plane point to the galactic poles. In actual usage, the terms galactic plane and galactic poles usually refer specifically to the plane and poles of the Milky Way, in which planet Earth is located.

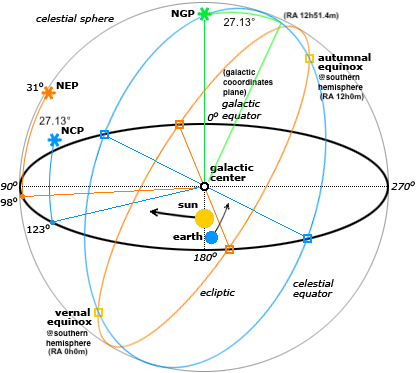
Orientation of the galactic, ecliptic and equatorial coordinate systems, projected on the celestial sphere.

Some galaxies are irregular and do not have any well-defined disk. Even in the case of a barred spiral galaxy like the Milky Way, defining the galactic plane is slightly imprecise and arbitrary since the stars are not perfectly coplanar. In 1959, the IAU defined the position of the Milky Way's north galactic pole as exactly RA = 12^{h} 49^{m} , Dec = 27° 24′ in the then-used B1950 epoch; while in the currently-used J2000 epoch, after precession is taken into account, its position is RA 12^{h} 51^{m} 26.282^{s}, Dec 27° 07′ 42.01″. This position is in Coma Berenices, near the bright star Arcturus; likewise, the south galactic pole lies in the constellation Sculptor.

The zero of longitude of galactic coordinates was also defined in 1959 to be at position angle 123° from the north celestial pole. Thus the zero longitude point on the galactic equator was at 17^{h} 42^{m} 26.603^{s}, −28° 55′ 00.445″ (B1950) or 17^{h} 45^{m} 37.224^{s}, −28° 56′ 10.23″ (J2000), and its J2000 position angle is 122.932°. The Galactic Center is located at position angle 31.72° (B1950) or 31.40° (J2000) east of north.

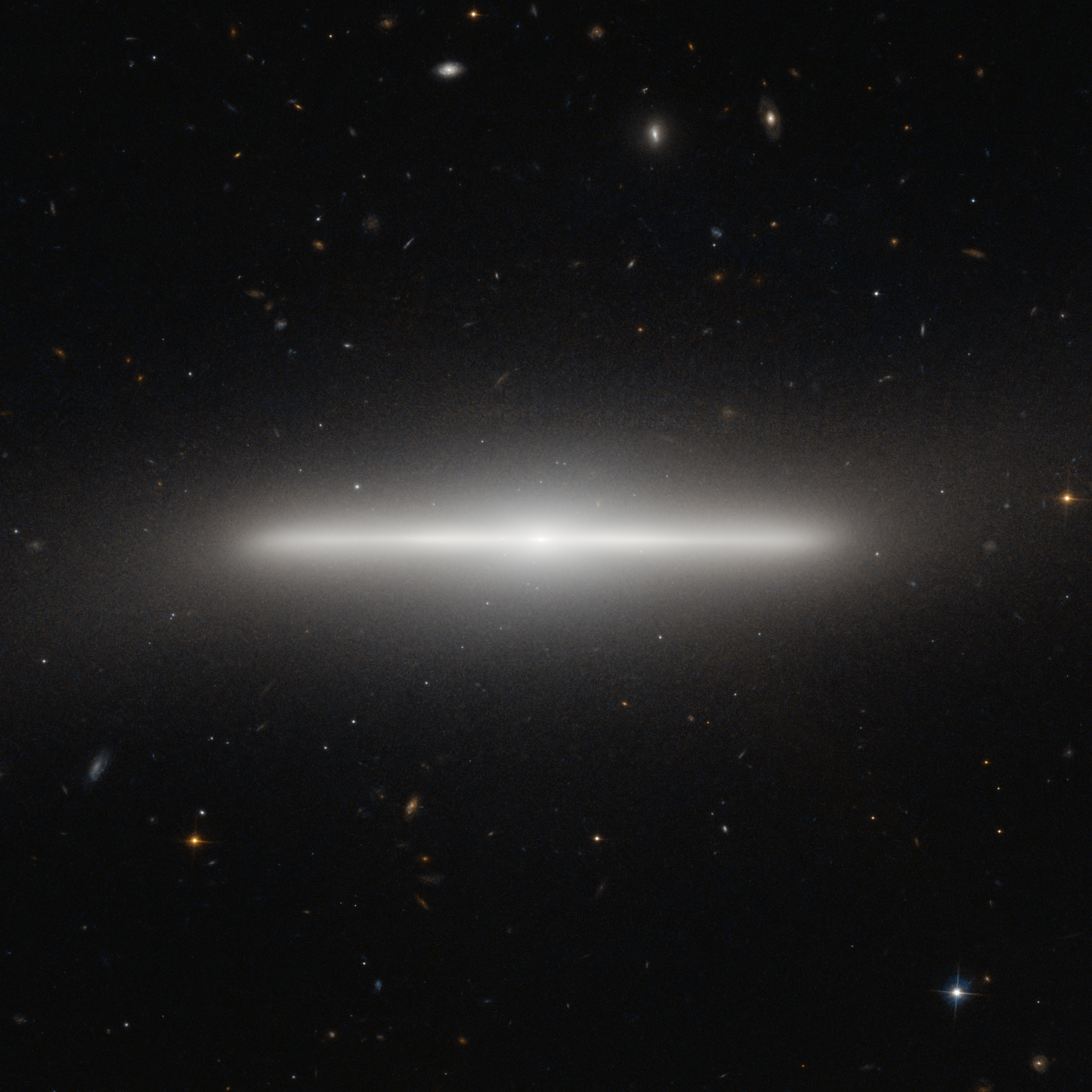
This edge-on view of the galaxy NGC 4452 from Earth shows its galactic plane, with the nucleus at the center.

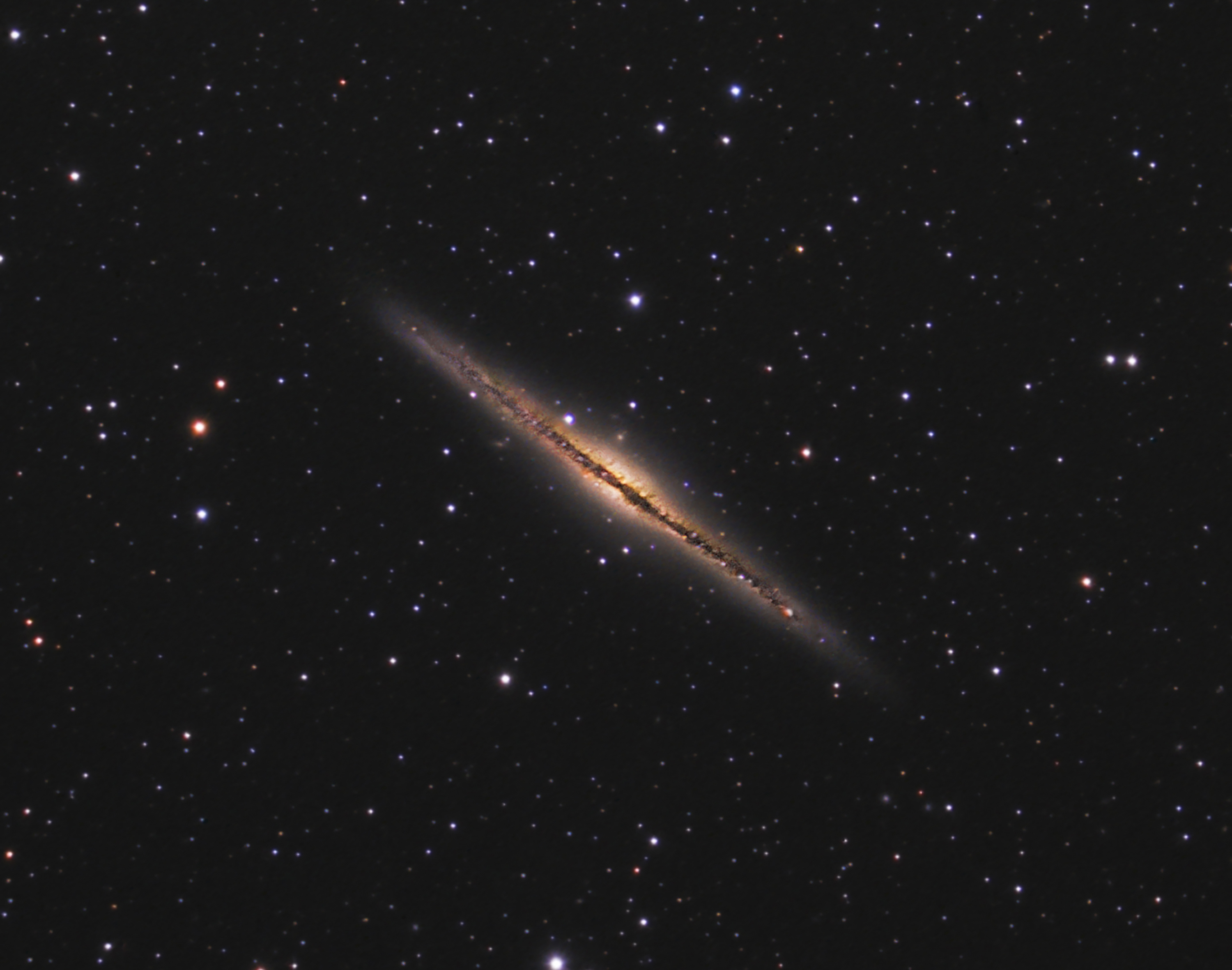
This edge-on view of the spiral galaxy NGC 891 shows the profile of a dusty galactic plane.

== See also ==
- Galactic coordinate system
- LHS 1815b example of outside galactic plane exoplanet
- Zone of Avoidance
- Supergalactic plane
