= Thomas G. Phillips =

British astronomer (1937–2022)

Thomas Gould Phillips
- Born: 18 April 1937; Watford, UK
- Died: 6 August 2022 (aged 85); Pasadena, California, USA
- Education: University of Oxford
- Children: Claire Phillips (author), Stephen Phillips (architect)
- Scientific career
- Fields: Physics, Astronomy
- Workplaces: Bell Labs, California Institute of Technology
- Thesis: Experiments with spin waves and phonons at microwave frequencies (1964)
- Doctoral advisor: Harold Max Rosenberg
- Doctoral students: Elliott R. Brown, Tom Buttgenbach, Robert J. Schoelkopf

Thomas Gould Phillips was a British-born physicist, who worked primarily in the United States. He was a pioneer in the field of submillimeter astronomy, who both developed new instrumentation and made ground-breaking observations. He oversaw the construction of, and was the first and longest-serving director of the Caltech Submillimeter Observatory.

== Early career ==
After completing his doctorate at Oxford University in 1964, Phillips was a research associate at Stanford University for one year. He returned to Oxford, serving as a lecturer for two years.

In 1968, Phiilips moved to Bell Labs, where he worked down the hallway from Arno Penzias and Robert Wilson. After Phillips attended a talk by Penzias about the recent (1970) detection of CO in the Orion Nebula, Penzias challenged Phillips to build a more sensitive receiver for millimeter astronomy. Phillips set about doing so, and in 1973 he made the first Indium Antimonide (InSb) hot electron bolometer heterodyne receiver used for astronomical observations. The receiver had a noise temperature three times lower than the Schottky diode receivers Wilson and Penzias had used to detect CO, and because the receiver also required less local oscillator power, it held the potential to be usable at higher frequencies. A few years later, Phillips was able to get the receiver to operate at 346 GHz, in the submillimeter wavelength regime. Because no radio telescopes could operate at such a high frequency, he used it on the Hale Telescope, an optical telescope with a surface accuracy more than sufficient for submillimeter observations. By 1980, Phillips' InSb receiver could operate at 492 GHz, and with it mounted on the Kuiper Airborne Observatory, the ^{3}P_{1}—^{3}P_{0} fine structure line of neutral atomic carbon was detected in the interstellar medium.

== Caltech ==
Phillips arrived at Caltech in 1978, as a visiting associate. He joined Caltech's faculty as a professor of physics in 1979.

By the late 1970s, Phillips had begun exploring a new receiver technology, the SIS receiver, whose optimization would occupy him for the next few decades. In this same time period, Caltech was building a millimeter-wave interferometer at the Owens Valley Radio Observatory (OVRO), consisting of three (initially - later six) Leighton antennas. Phillips was made the director of OVRO during the period that the interferometer was made operational.

The OVRO site was not good enough to allow submillimeter observations most of the time, so in 1980, Phillips began the process of getting permits and funding to move a Leighton antenna to Mauna Kea, a site high enough to allow submillimeter work. As a result, the Caltech Submillimeter Observatory was constructed on Mauna Kea, and Phillips served as its first director.

Phillips spent decades working with NASA to launch a space-based submillimeter observatory. Eventually US and European efforts to produce such an instrument were merged, and Phillips became the co-Principal Investigator for the HIFI receiver on the Herschel Space Observatory.

== Awards and honors ==
- 1975 - Fellow of American Physical Society (APS)
- 2004 - Joseph Weber Award for Astronomical Instrumentation
- 2010 - NASA Exceptional Public Service Medal
- 2014 - Doctor Honoris Causa from Paris Observatory
