= Long Wavelength Array =

Radio telescope array series for astronomical purposes

- LWA antennas in New Mexico, the main site of the array

- Location: New Mexico
- Wavelength: 10~88 MHz
- Telescope style: Interferometer
- Website: lwa.phys.unm.edu

The Long Wavelength Array (LWA) is a radio telescope in the United States. It began routine observations in 2011, and formally became online in late 2015. It is one of the few observatories to utilize relatively low frequencies (10-88 MHz), and is used to study relativistic particles, cosmic evolution, astrophysical plasma, decametric radio emissions from Jupiter-like extrasolar planets, and giant flares from magnetars.

The goal was to build 50 to 53 stations in total, with a total of 13,000 dipole antennas strategically placed in an area nearly 400 kilometres (250 miles) in diameter. However, the plan now is to deploy the system across the whole United States so as to expand its capability and increase the range of objects it can observe. The system can scan the sky at HF and VHF frequencies.

The array is officially recognized as an SKA pathfinder project. The project is a collaboration between UNM, VT, LANL, JPL, NRL, UI, BIRS, NRAO and AFRL.

== History ==
The map of operating and planned Long Wavelength Array assets as of 2025

The program began in 2006 under the support of the Office of Naval Research. The system began with the Long Wavelength Demonstrator Array (LWDA), consisting of 16 blade antennas.

The first station, located adjacent to the NRAO's VLA, consists of 256 antennas and was completed in December 2009. It was dedicated in April 2010, and routine operations began in 2011.

The second station (LWA2) was under construction about 19 km (12 mi) away as of 2011. The array later came to be known as the LWA-SV.

In 2012, the LWA announced that they have successfully become a University Radio Observatory and is sponsored by the National Science Foundation. They also announced the first round of results from the LWA-1. In the same year, the OVRO-LWA array started to appear in literature, with the planning and construction starting the very next year in 2013.

From 2013 to 2014, the team, along with OVRO and CalTech, commenced work on the first stage of the OVRO-LWA array. The array consists of 251 elements.

LWA-SV (Sevilleta) consists of 256 antennas located in the Sevilleta National Wildlife Refuge. The LWA team installed the electronics shelter in April, 2014, and the array was subsequently completed on October 17th, 2015. The shelter is a 8x9.5x20 ft container with EMI shielding. In addition, work commenced on Stage II of the OVRO-LWA array, adding another 32 antennas and correlators, extending the baseline to 1.5km, with works completed in 2020.

Workers laying cables for the LWA-SV element of the Long Wavelength Array

In January, 2024, the OVRO-LWA array at the Owens Valley Radio Observatory of CalTech and sponsored by the National Science Foundation began routine operation. Initially planned for the 58 MHz to 85MHz range with 251 elements (Stage I), it was then expanded to 283 elements (Stage II), with the array eventually came to become a 352-element array operating at 15 to 85MHz (Stage III).

The LWA-NA, located around 0.5km from the VLA, came online in 2023, supplementing the capabilities of the existing LWA network by allowing longer baselines, more astronomical observations, etc. It is the first SWARM station to be deployed within the LWA concept. The station is connected to the VLA through a 1GBps datalink and comes with more than 20% of recycled materials from previous trials and setups.

On June 13th, 2025, the LWA-MC (Meteor Crater) site at Arizona State University received its first antenna set for testing.

As of February, 2026, the LWA-1 and LWA-NA are being commissioned after major upgrades, while the LWA-SV array is totally offline as upgrades are underway.

== Overview ==
The system is primarily based in New Mexico, with the core being within the vicinity of the Very Large Array. The system, as of 2026, consists of one OVRO-LWA station with 352 elements, two full stations each featuring 256 elements and a mini-station of 64 elements.

There were two additional mini-stations slated for construction at Texas Tech University and Arizona State University according to sources in 2019, and updated to ten mini-stations plus two full stations later in time. The ten new mini-stations will be located at Texas Tech University (with two to be hosted), Quest University, University of Kansas, Embry-Riddle Aeronautical University, University of Texas Rio Grande Valley, University of Florida, SUNY Old Westbury, and Hillsdale College. The two additional full stations will be at Arizona State University and University of Colorado Boulder.

The system was designed with two main goals: scientific discoveries and student S&T trainings. Hence, the system is designed to be modular for hands-on testing and verifications, while being able to innovate with the pace of technology. The system also comes in standardized parts and blueprints so as to enable future expansions.

We are one of the last remaining university radio observatories where students can actually go out and be part of every aspect of construction and operations of a radio telescope

— Greg Taylor, Distinguished Professor on Physics and Astronomy at University of New Mexico,

The antennas come in four inverted V shape aluminum-based structures arranged in a X-like structure when seen from above, each functioning as a dipole. The design allows the system to distinguish between left-handed polarization and right-handed polarization. The antennas are with a declination of -30° to 90° and a bandwidth of 19.6 MHz. As the system utilizes dipole-based designs, the need for giant dishes is effectively eliminated, allowing students to work hands-on owing to its low size, weight, and price (SWaP) footprint. Each antenna stands about 1.5 metres (5 ft) high and about 2.7 metres (9 ft) across the base.

Three data products can be obtained from the LWA-1 array, namely TBW, TBN, and DRX, with one additional data product originally obtainable now inaccessible owing to unknown reasons. The inaccessible data product will probably not be back online anytime soon per the LWA team even after overhauls, as per their plan. For the LWA-SV array, there are four products obtainable, namely TBF, TBN, DRX, and COR.

The LWA-SV and LWA-1 systems operate within the range of 10MHz to 88 MHz, producing a cumulative 1TB per hour, with each full station spanning a diameter of around 100m with a minimum separation of 5m between the antennas. The OVRO-LWA site (Long Wavelength Array at Owens Valley Radio Observatory, on the other hand, operates within the range of 12MHz to 85 MHz, generating more than 50TB in 24 hours. The frequency range was carefully selected to mitigate the interferences from FM radio interferences, with which the band starts at around 87 to 88 MHz. Along with the low sensitivity towards the horizon, the system is designed to minimize possible radio frequency interference (RFI) effects.

== LWA Swarm ==
The LWA Swarm is a concept envisaged by the LWA team as a means of proliferating long wavelength observation capability that are in the VLBI fashion. The LWA arrays interconnected within the network will thus be each functioning as a single telescope collecting data and comparing the observed information with the other telescopes within the array so as to mitigate RFI all while producing the final image as a whole. The LWA stations are thus part of the "Swarm" so as to enable astronomical discoveries and RFI discriminations.

The mini-station, or "LWA Swarm Stations", come in two formations, 48-element-type and 64-element-type, both with a minimum usable life of over 20 years. The stations are to Upgrading from 64-element-type to a full station of 256 elements is also possible. The flagship mini-station, the LWA-NA, came with a commercially available American Products Freedom series shelter, with the dimension being 78x90x42 inch, which is different from the customized 8x9.5x20 ft container for the previous full station efforts.

Each mini-station part cost approximately $112,000 to build and around $7,000/year in upkeep, and the full station's parts cost $600,000 each with a cumulative cost of around $1M each to build.

LWA sites
Name	Location	Status	Number of antennas	Swarm network integration	Note
LWA-1	Socorro, New Mexico	Operational	256	Yes	First station to be built.
LWA-SV	Sevilleta National Wildlife Refuge	Operational	256	Yes	Second station in the series, originally called the LWA-2.
LWA-NA	Socorro, New Mexico	Operational	64	Yes	Flagship LWA Swarm project.
OVRO-LWA	Owens Valley Radio Observatory	Operational	352 (243 core + 109 in long baseline arrangement)	No	The biggest single station within the series. Yet to be integrated into the Swarm network.
TBD	Texas Tech University	Planned	64	—N/a	Funded by the DoD through the Defense University Research Instrumentation Program. It will be used to study the sporadic E-layer of the Ionosphere.
TBD	Sam Houston State University	Planned	64	—N/a	To be hosted along a PlaneWave CDK-700 at the newly built Dominey Observatory. Funding from the US Air Force started in 2026.
LWA-MC	Arizona State University	Planned	64	—N/a	Managed by Lo-Co Lab, started RFI and precursing testing in 2025.

Hillsdale College also currently operates a smaller 13-antennae array called the Low-Frequency All-Sky Monitor (LoFASM) in addition to its contributions in the LWA-NA array, with routine tours to the LWA-1 and LWA-SV tours so as to gain familiarity with the system.The array exemplifies the S&T training mission assigned to the project since its inception. A total of four LoFASM stations are deployed, with each quintessentially featuring 12 antennas dedicated to studying low frequency radio transients.

The OVRO-LWA array has 3,072 channels available, each with 25kHz in bandwidth. The array, when used to image the sun, has a imaging capability of 0.1s and 100kHz resolution. The array also has a resolving capability of up to 1ms when used in spectrogram mode. The array, along with the nearby EOVSA, forms the cornerstone of the Owens Valley Radio Observatory's solar research capability.

The sensitivity of the system is drastically higher than that of the LOFAR, which is already higher than the VLA, coming with a SEFD of around 1 MJy when using a single antenna and 6KJy and 24KJy for the full stations and the mini-stations respectively when measured per station.

== Expanded Long Wavelength Array ==
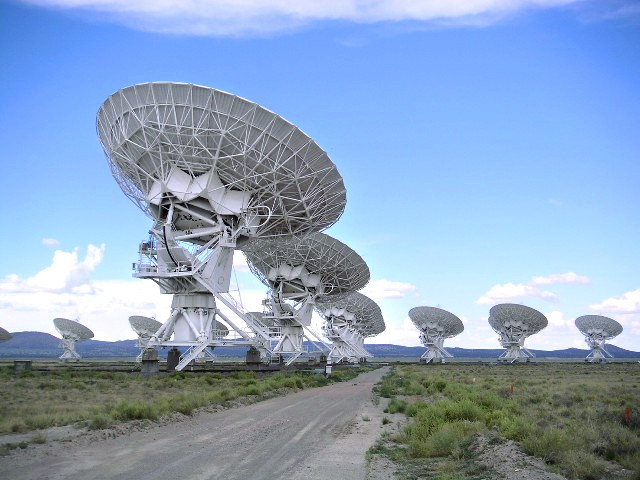
The VLA array that is used in the ELWA VLBI array.

The Expanded Long Wavelength Array (ELWA), or sometimes abbreviated as eLWA, is formed with LWA-SV and LWA-1 in conjunction with the 27 operating antennas from the Very Large Array. For the sake of convenience, ones who would like to access the ELWA system only need to apply through the VLA's portal without the need to make two proposals separately. Ones who are granted access to the ELWA through the VLA application system is automatically granted LWA usage.

The project was formally commissioned in 2018 and operates with a designed bandwidth of 10 MHz. The project was formed through a consortium between the Long Wavelength Array team, National Radio Astronomy Observatory, Virginia Tech, and Harvard-Smithsonian Center for Astrophysics to better utilize the low frequency capabilities of both systems, extending the baseline so as to improve observational capabilities.

The ELWA operates with a center frequency of 76MHz and a bandwidth of 8MHz during routine operations per the 2027A observing session. By using very-long-baseline interferometry (VLBI), the system has an effective aperture of nearly 100km.

== Sub-Projects and Derivatives ==
=== DLITE ===
The Deployable Low-Band Ionosphere and Transient Experiment (DLITE) is a low-cost radio telescope based on the LWA technology for everybody use. It was developed by the United States Naval Research Laboratory (NRL) and sponsored by the Defense Advanced Research Projects Agency (DARPA) for the LWA team. The NRL operates two DLITE sites as of September, 2021, namely the DLITE-NM (New Mexico) array and the DLITE-POM (Pomonkey) array. The system is capable of employing both time difference of arrival (TDOA) and frequency difference of arrival (FDOA) techniques on distant bright astronomical subjects of the "A Team" genre in the ionospheric probing mission via monitoring the fluctuations and differences in measurements. It is also used in Solar Weather monitoring, including solar radio burst.

The design architecture schematics of the DLITE system

The kit consists of four identical individual elements with the LWA operating at 20 to 80MHz with a bandwidth of 8.33MHz and is intended for spreading the architecture worldwide for both S&T trainings and meteorological purposes. It usually operates within the 30~40MHz band owing to its ionospheric focus and designed sensitivity. The use of 8.33MHz in bandwidth was mandated owing to the choice of using 16-bit system and correlator resource limitations, though up to 10MHz may be possible in certain conditions.

Abbreviated sometimes as the DLITE 4 (because there are four elements within the system), each kit cost around $45k in total and spans a baseline of around 300m to 500m depending on the observation plan. The kit can be set up as an operational observation system in a few days with a mere 2~3 people. So as to minimize cost and complications, the system, aside from already using existing antenna design from the LWAs, employs COTS equipment and open source at large, including software-defined radio (SDR), GNU Radio, Astropy, etc. This ensures that each kit comes at an acceptable frontal expense, enabling the proliferation of the system for both educational and technical purposes.

The system has officially been deployed in South Africa, Maryland, Florida, New Mexico, and Ohio. It is typically arranged in a formation where three of the antennas form an equilateral triangle encircling the antenna sitting in the center, with each side being roughly 350 to 500m. This configuration allows it to perform TDOA in every direction, which requires a minimum of three antennas, while being both redundant and easier in VLBI computations. The use of four antennas instead of a mere three also increased the amount of unique baselines from three to six, enabling better characterization of the ionospheric conditions without drastically increasing the SWaP (Size, Weight, and Price) of the system.

Observational data from the DLITE-NM and DLITE-POM arrays are available publicly on the Defense Technical Information Center's system upon United States Naval Research Laboratory Distribution A approval.

=== LoFASM ===
The Low-Frequency All-Sky Monitor (LoFASM) is a derivative in which each station consists of 12 antenna sets and usually an additional outrigger, dedicated to perform low frequency radio transient observations as was listed as a priority within the National Research Council's ASTRO2010 decadal survey. The system utilizes the LWA's antennas and Front End Electronics (FEE) boards with the rest being systems designed to fit the purpose of LoFASM specifically.

Funded by the DoD with FPGA donation from Xilinx (the Virtex-5), there are five such systems deployed at Port Mansfield, Socorro, Green Bank, NASA's Goldstone deep space communication complex, and Hillsdale College respectively under a collaboration between Virginia Tech, Jet Propulsion Laboratory, University of New Mexico, the US Naval Research Laboratory, and other LWA stakeholders.

The systems can enable immediate discrimination between interferences, noises, and astronomical subjects, improving the astronomical surveyal capability of partnering systems. The system in deployed in a concentric manner, with each ring consisting of 6 such antennas. The outer ring's radius is $}\sqrt{3$ times that of the inner ring. A 13th antenna is then deployed a distance away as an outrigger. This concentric double ring structure has been shown to be able to best eliminate horizon interference through Monte Carlo method on 750,000 different configurations at 20Mhz, which is its frequency of maximum sensitivity, making it the easiest way to mitigate local interferences.

LoFASM systems
Name	Location	Status	Type	Note
LoFASM I	Port Mansfield, Texas	Operational		Managed by the University of Texas at Brownsville.
LoFASM II	Socorro, New Mexico	Inactive	One without an outrigger, used higher loss cables	Just outside of the LWA-1 station, in adjacent to the Very Large Array, later removed to make space for LWA-NA.
LoFASM III	Green Bank, West Virginia	Operational		The first one of the series to be calibrated.
LoFASM IV	Goldstone Deep Space Communications Complex	Operational		
LoFASM V	Hillsdale College	Operational	Joined with a Memorandum of understanding	The latest addition to the series.

The signals from the same ring is combined into the same signal, with the two polarizations separated. This creates a total of four signals from the two rings plus two additional signals from the outrigger, resulting in a total of six signals cumulatively. A combiner box is also quintessentially applied as a means of protection for the ROACH boards and the ARX boards.

== See also ==
- Australian Square Kilometre Array Pathfinder
- List of astronomical observatories
- LOFAR
- MeerKAT
- Murchison Widefield Array
- Square Kilometre Array
