= Frequency-Agile Solar Radiotelescope =

Proposed radio telescope

- Location: United States
- Coordinates: 37°14′00″N 118°17′00″W
- Website: www.fasr.org
- Location within the United States

Frequency-Agile Solar Radiotelescope (FASR) is a proposed next-generation radio telescope for solar observation in radio and microwave frequency range.

In contrast to other general-purpose radio telescopes, such as the Very Large Array, FASR is specifically designed for solar observations. Compared with other astronomical sources, radio emission from the sun is highly time variable and the range of emission is very high.

The construction site of FASR is not yet determined but it will be somewhere in the southwest United States, as is its predecessor EOVSA
