= Claire Phillips (author) =

American memoirist and mental health writer

- Born: Oxford, England
- Education: San Francisco State University B.A. New York University M.A.
- Occupation: Writer
- Relatives: Thomas G. Phillips (father), Joy Phillips (mother), Stephen Phillips (architect) (brother)
- Writing career
- Genres: Essay; Fantasy; Science Fiction; Memoir
- Notable awards: The Best American Essays, Pushcart Prize, American Academy of Poets Prize
- Website: claire-phillips.com

Claire Phillips is a British-born American fiction writer, educator, and essayist. She is a recipient of the Academy of American Poets Prize, a Pushcart Prize notable, and an honorable mention in The Best American Essays. Her writing has appeared in Black Clock, The Brooklyn Rail, the Los Angeles Review of Books, and Motherboard-Vice, amongst other publications.

== Personal life ==
Born in Oxford, England, she immigrated to the United States at three years old with her family to live in New Jersey after her father Thomas G Phillips began to work at Bell Labs in 1968. In 1978, they relocated to Pasadena in while he was working at Caltech.

She received her bachelor's degree in English at San Francisco State University in 1987 and studied poetry with Language Poets/Writers. She also holds a M.A. in Creative Writing from New York University.

Phillips has taught writing at CalArts, SCI-Arc, and U.C. Irvine, and is director of the Los Angeles Writers Reading Series at Glendale College, where authors Anne Boyer, Steph Cha, Brian Evenson, Porochista Khakpour, Robin Coste Lewis, Sarah Manguso, and Charles Yu have appeared, among others.

Currently she resides in Altadena, where her home was lost in the Eaton Fire of January 7, 2025. Her brother, Stephen Phillips, designed a Case Study 2.0 model home for her, named The Claire Phillips Butterfly House. The home won the AIALA NEXT LA Design Award for the design of a fire-resistant single family project that addresses contemporary climate conditions in Los Angeles.

== Career ==
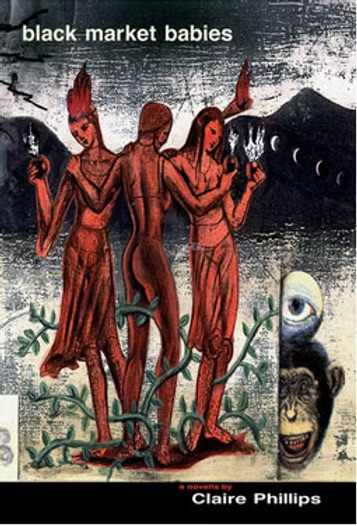
The novella Black Market Babies. Cover art by Jonathon Rosen.

While earning her bachelor's degree she won the American Academy of Poets First Prize for her poem "Function is as His". Her piece "Violent Acts Within Public Discourse" was the only student work to be published by Barrett Watten and Lyn Hejinian in the Poetics Journal #6. Phillips was also the co-editor of If Magazine, the experimental poetry magazine at S.F.S.U.

After graduating S.F.S.U she freelanced at L.A. Weekly. Soon after she self-published the fantasy mystery novella Black Market Babies with 11th Hour Press. The novella was distributed by Last Gasp Comics in San Francisco.

Since then, Phillips has lectured and taught at institutions such as SCI-Arc, SVA, UC Irvine, Art Center College of Design, CalArts, and hosted events with non-profits like Clockshop in Los Angeles. Her creative writing courses specialize in science fiction, the fantastic, and memoir with an emphasis on illness narratives and experimental practices.

At the 2025 AWP Conference and Bookfair she moderated the panel discussion titled "New Literary Forms for a New Literary Los Angeles."

She the co-founder and director of the LA Writers Series since its inception in 2010. There she hosts lectures by authors local to Los Angeles at Glendale College. She has been a regular contributor to Black Clock and The Brooklyn Rail.

=== Mental health and disability narratives ===
In 2014, Black Clock commissioned the essay "Hanging from the Chandeliers," where she traces her Jewish immigrant mother Joy's achievements as a criminal defense lawyer in conjunction with her many hospitalizations for schizophrenic episodes throughout her life. The essay is a timeline of events spanning multiple decades from the late 50s until her mother's death in 2013. The essay received a Pushcart nomination and honorable mention in The Best American Essays 2015.

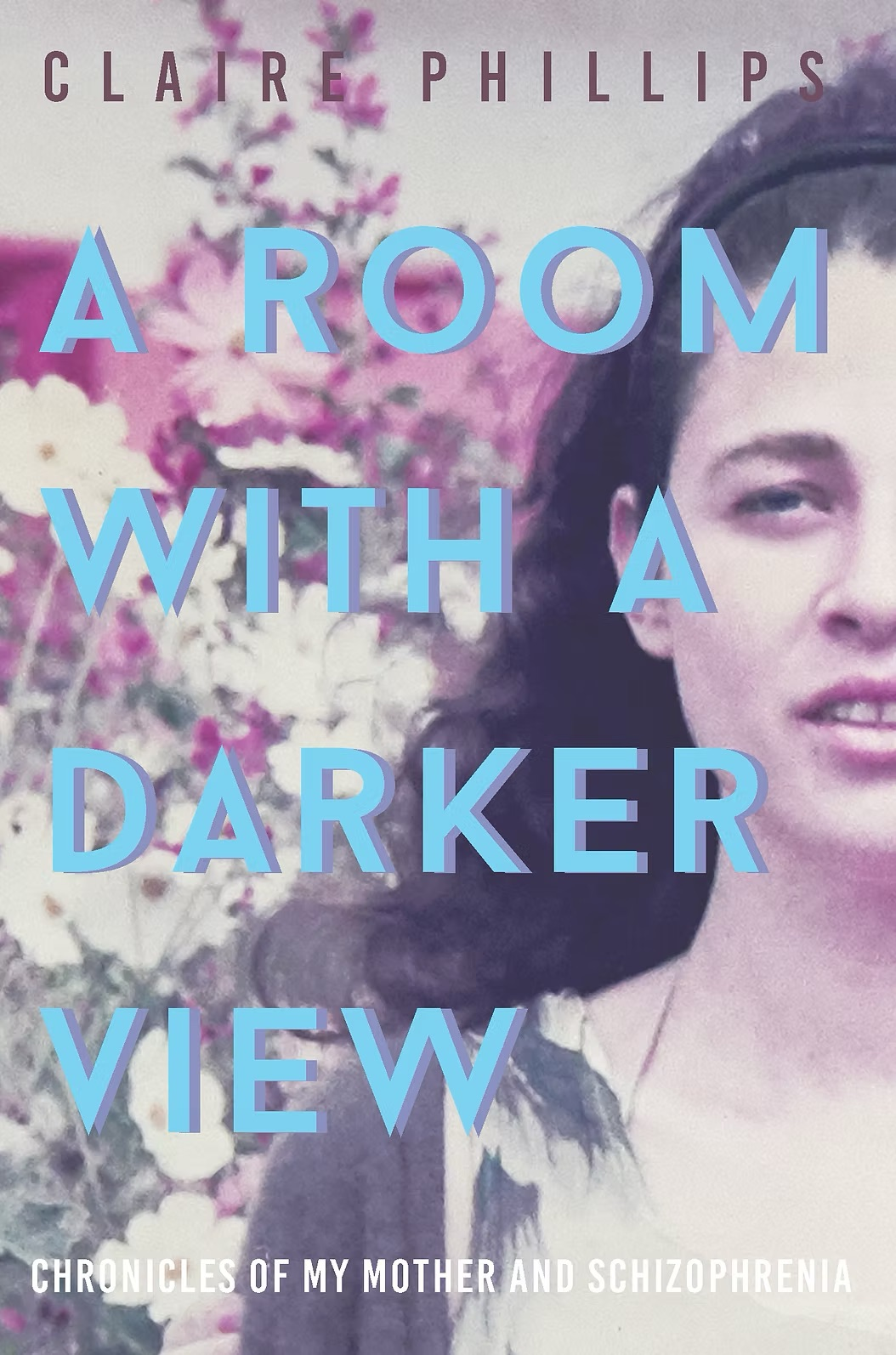
Phillips' memoir A Room with a Darker View: Chronicles of My Mother and Schizophrenia. Cover art by Nike Schroeder.

Later, she published the memoir A Room with a Darker View: Chronicles of My Mother and Schizophrenia with DoppelHouse Press in August 2020. Written in a fragmented and confessional series of vignettes, the book weaves themes of family, mental illness, and feminism throughout. Similar to "Hanging from the Chandeliers", Phillips continues to explore her relationship with her mother in A Room with a Darker View, recounting the evolution of their relationship at various stages of her paranoid schizophrenia. The book is considered a part of a contemporary wave of literature on the subject of disability and mental health. She cites Maggie Nelson, Esmé Weijun Wang, Sarah Manguso, Bruce Bauman, and Phillip K Dick's genre-defying works as inspirations to "examine [her] family story without focusing on feelings of deprivation."

After publishing her book she taught a workshop titled "Writing Through Madness" with Bruce Bauman for Dallas Writing Workshops and Write or Die Magazine pertaining to the mental health of the authors and the characters in their works. This same year she published the essay "Lunacy and the Literary Provocateur: Life Writing & Schizophrenia," which analyzed representation in various "psychiatric memoirs" and the impact these works had for bringing awareness to a spectrum of neurodivergent diagnoses.

She also appeared in the AWP Panel discussion "Writing About Mental Illness" in March 2022. There she discussed approaches to writing about mental illness, family history, and psychiatric care with writers working in a variety of styles, ranging from graphic forms to narrative nonfiction.

Since then she has advocated for de-stigmatizing mental health treatment and interviewed other authors within the genre like Emily Rapp Black and Maria Bamford.

== Critical reception ==
Phillips' novella Black Market Babies was reviewed in The Village Voice by Joy Kats who described passages from the book as "empathetic, and stirringly imagined."

Her short story "Invisible Woman" was praised by Katherine Manderfield in a piece for LAist, where she remarks, "The story is a wonderfully bizarre series of correspondence from SCUM Manifesto author, Valerie Solanas to Andy Warhol. In this piece, Phillips writes, 'Solanas’ ten-thousand letters to Warhol have been distilled here to best represent the writer's enduring and noble spirit.' Full of voice and a fair bit of mania, the piece is terrifically inventive, and Phillips’ sardonic wit shines."

Describing the memoir A Room with a Darker View, author and critic Steve Erickson noted, "Claire Phillips’ writing always finds the scary corners that would be secret to any other author, from which inevitably there comes into vision a revelatory perspective. Reading A Room With a Darker View, you won't shake it from your mind; finishing it, you won't shake it from your memory."

== Bibliography ==
=== Books ===
- A Room with a Darker View: Chronicles of My Mother and Schizophrenia (DoppelHouse Press, 2020)
- Black Market Babies (11th Hour Press, 1998)

=== Non-fiction ===
- "Growth House," Video, The Center of Living Arts in Mobile, Alabama, in collaboration with Tom Leeser, Summer 2013;
- "Tom’s Midnight Glow Den," Tales of Tomorrow, Pasadena Armory, March 2013
- "Hanging from the Chandeliers," essay, Black Clock issue 19, 2014
- "In My Father’s Closet: Considering the Jewish Novel, Saul Below and Bruce Bauman," essay, Los Angeles Review of Books, December 2016
- Playlist Essay, Largehearted Boy, September 2020
- "Motherhood, Mental Health, & Illness, Always with a Book: Author Interview," This Book That Book, January 2021
- "Lunacy and the Literary Provacateur: Life Writing and Schizophrenia," 2021, Nomadic Journal
- "Motherhood, Mental Health, & Illness," Always with a Book: Author Interview, May 2021
- "A Gift I Couldn’t Offer My Mother," Los Angeles Review of Books, Author Interview, April 2021
- In the Spotlight, Write or Die Magazine, Author Interview, April 2021
- "Emily Rapp Black with Claire Phillips" Interview in the Dec/Jan 21–22 issue of The Brooklyn Rail.
- "The Stories That Save Us," Vol 1. Brooklyn, Jan 2022
- "And It Was Running Thin" an essay excerpted from A Room with a Darker View in Joyland Magazine, 2022
- "Craig Clevenger with Claire Phillips" Interview in the June 2024 issue of The Brooklyn Rail.
- "MARIA BAMFORD with Claire Philips" Interview in the February 2025 issue of The Brooklyn Rail.
- "JONATHAN LETHEM with Claire Phillips" Interview in the November 2025 issue of The Brooklyn Rail.

=== Short fiction ===
- "Tove’s Secret Letter Writing Campaign," The Writers’ Block, KQED-NPR podcast, Spring 2007
- "Invisible Woman," Black Clock 15, 2012
- "Tubular," Black Clock 16, February 2013
- "The Lost Psychedelic Episode of Dragnet," Black Clock 20, April 2015
- "The Last Rites of Quotient Lorenzo-Lochbaum," Motherboard Magazine, 2018

== Awards and honors ==
- Pushcart Nomination for "Hanging from the Chandeliers"
- Academy of American Poets Prize for "Function is as His," 1986
- Teaching fellow at N.Y.U., 1993
- The Best American Essays honorable mention for "Hanging from the Chandeliers," 2015
- Reading series G.C.C. Ancillary Adjunct Awards, 2009–2020
- Glendale College Foundation Grant, 2011–2020
