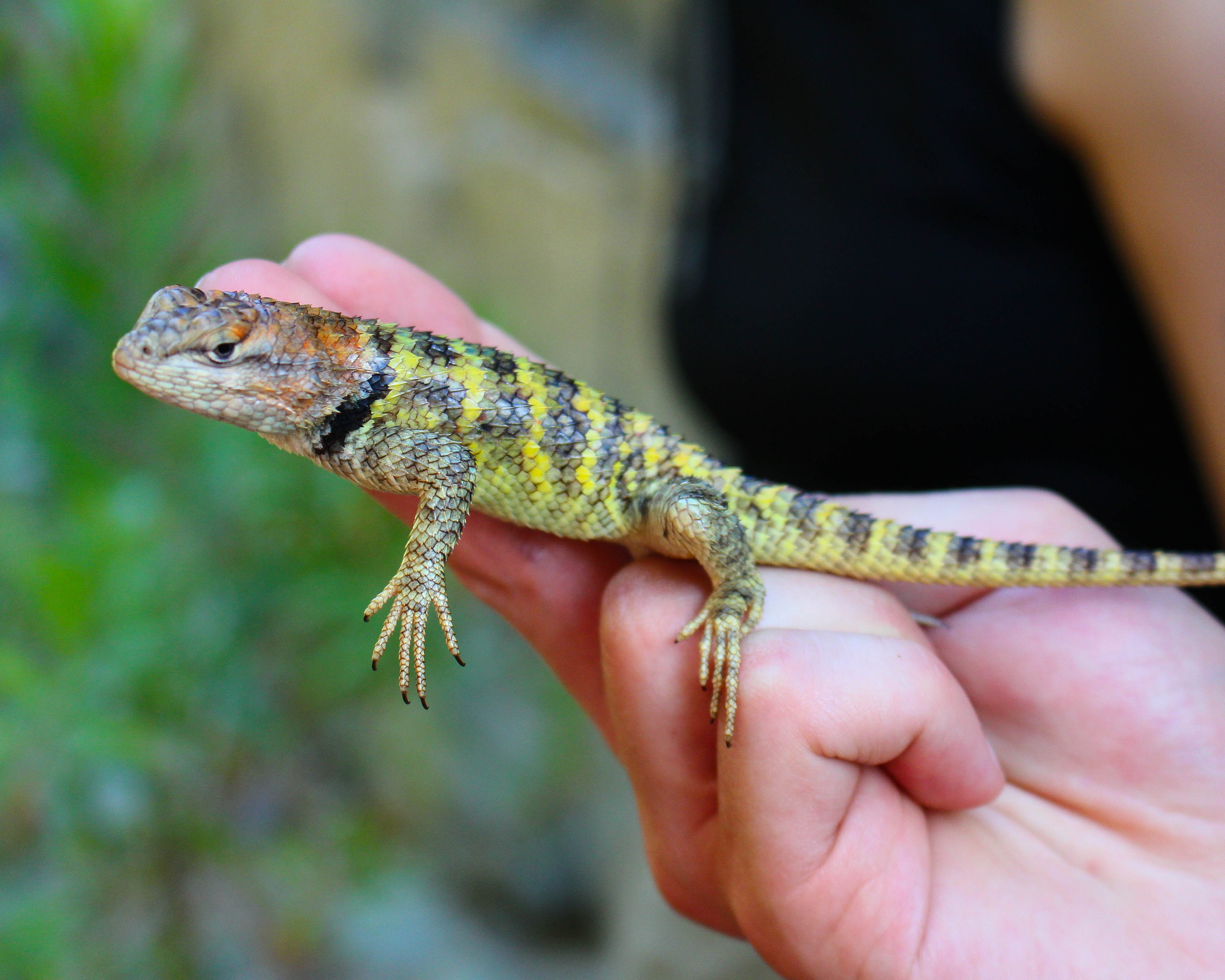

Scientific classification
- Kingdom: Animalia
- Phylum: Chordata
- Class: Reptilia
- Order: Squamata
- Suborder: Iguania
- Family: Phrynosomatidae
- Genus: Sceloporus
- Species: S. uniformis

Binomial name
- Sceloporus uniformis Phelan & Brattstrom, 1955

Synonyms
- Sceloporus magister uniformis

= Sceloporus uniformis =

Yellow-backed spiny lizard

Species of lizard

Sceloporus uniformis, also known as the yellow-backed spiny lizard, is a reptile of the family Phrynosomatidae. It is native to the Mojave, Great Basin, and San Joaquin deserts. Until recently, it was considered to be a subspecies of Sceloporus magister.

== Taxonomy ==
Sceloporus uniformis was originally described as a subspecies of Sceloporus magister in 1955. In 2006, genetic analysis revealed that S. uniformis is sufficiently distinct to merit classification as its own species.

== Description ==
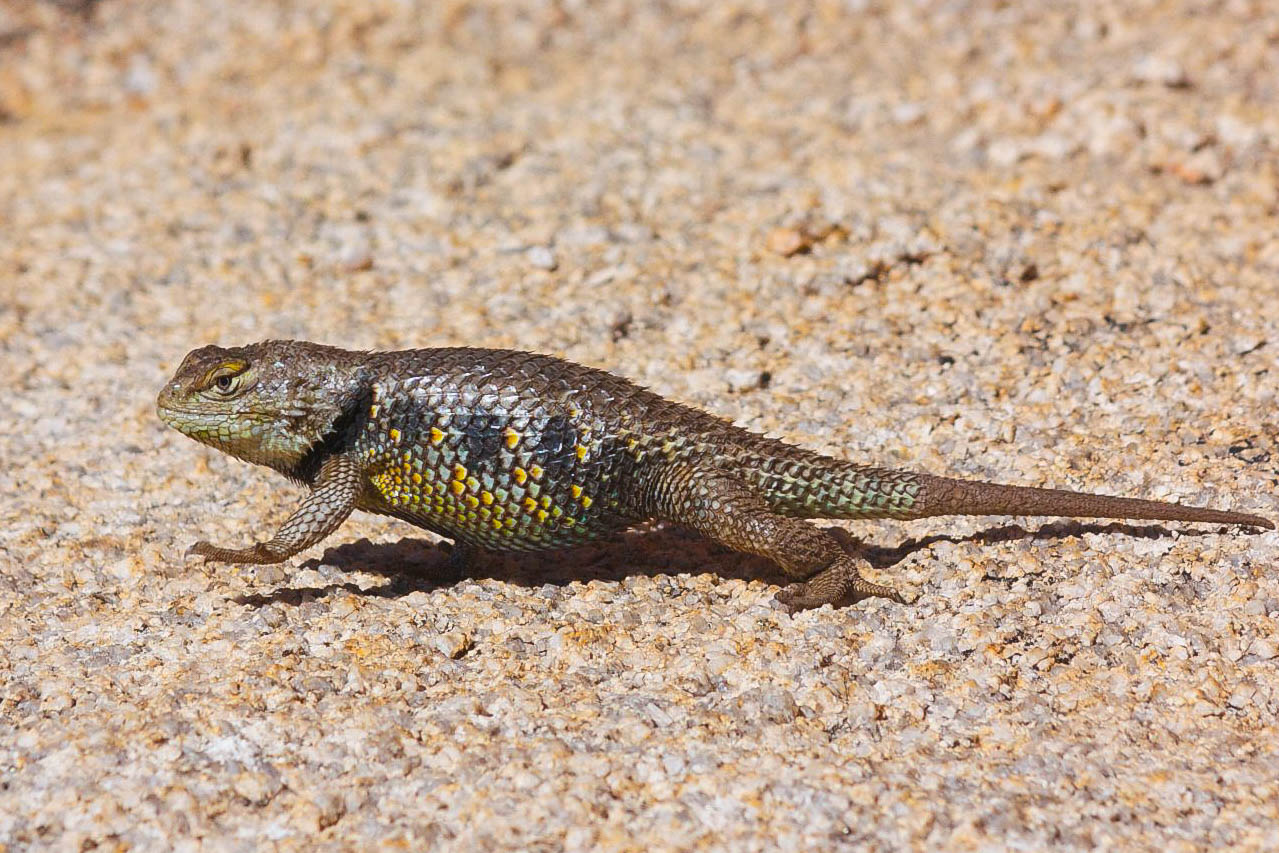
Sceloporus uniformis (adult male).

S. uniformis is a large robust lizard, and adults can grow to 5.5 inches in body length (snout-to-vent), with a tail slightly longer than the body. Color is brown or tan with yellow and black dorsal stripes or mottling and a black collar on the sides of the neck.

Males are larger than females, and have a swollen tail base, enlarged postanal scales and femoral pores, and bluish markings on the throat and belly. Females have a pale throat and underbelly, with faint or no blue markings. The head of a female may be orange or reddish in the breeding season.

== Range, habitat, and diet ==
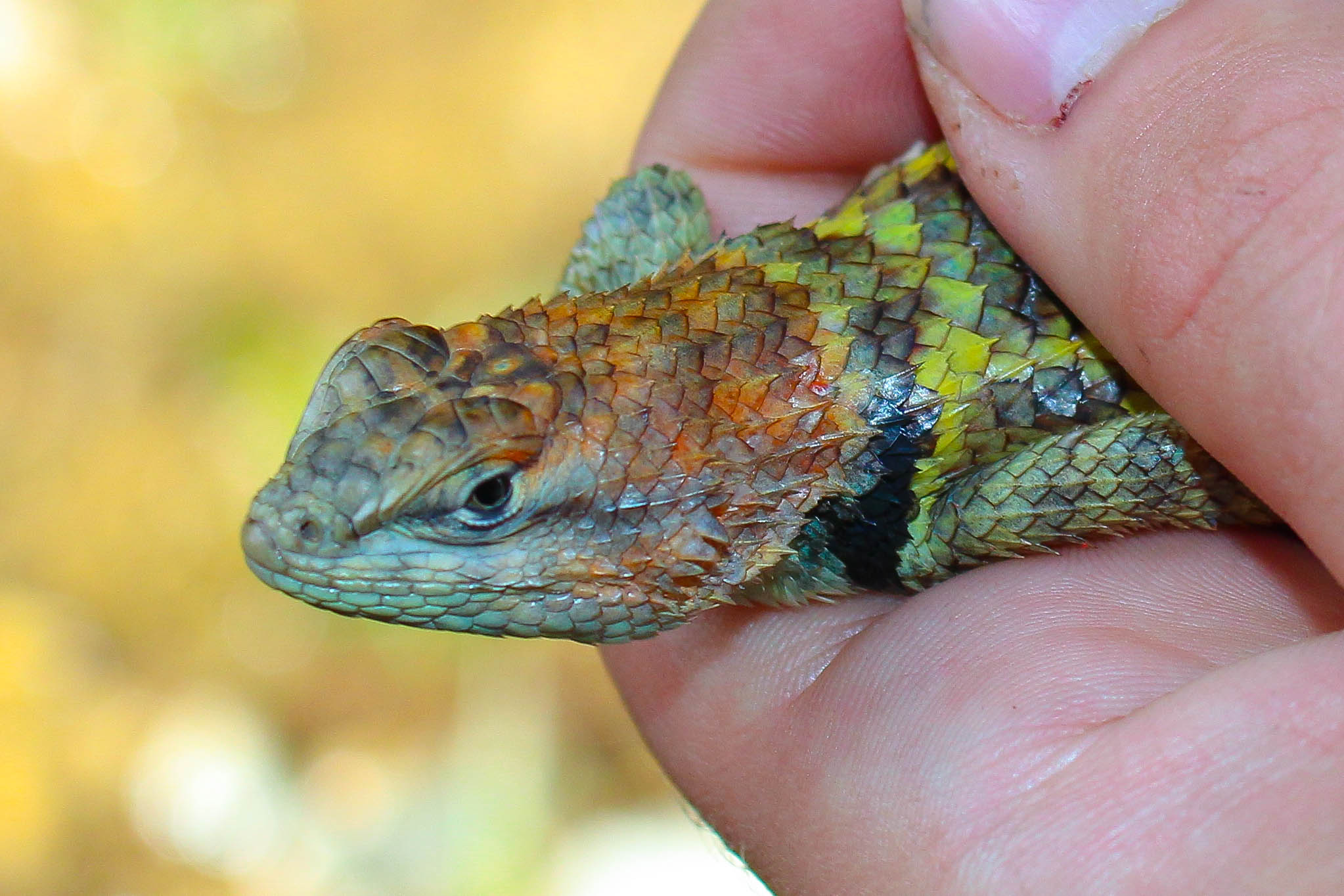
Sceloporus uniformis (breeding female). Inyo County, CA.

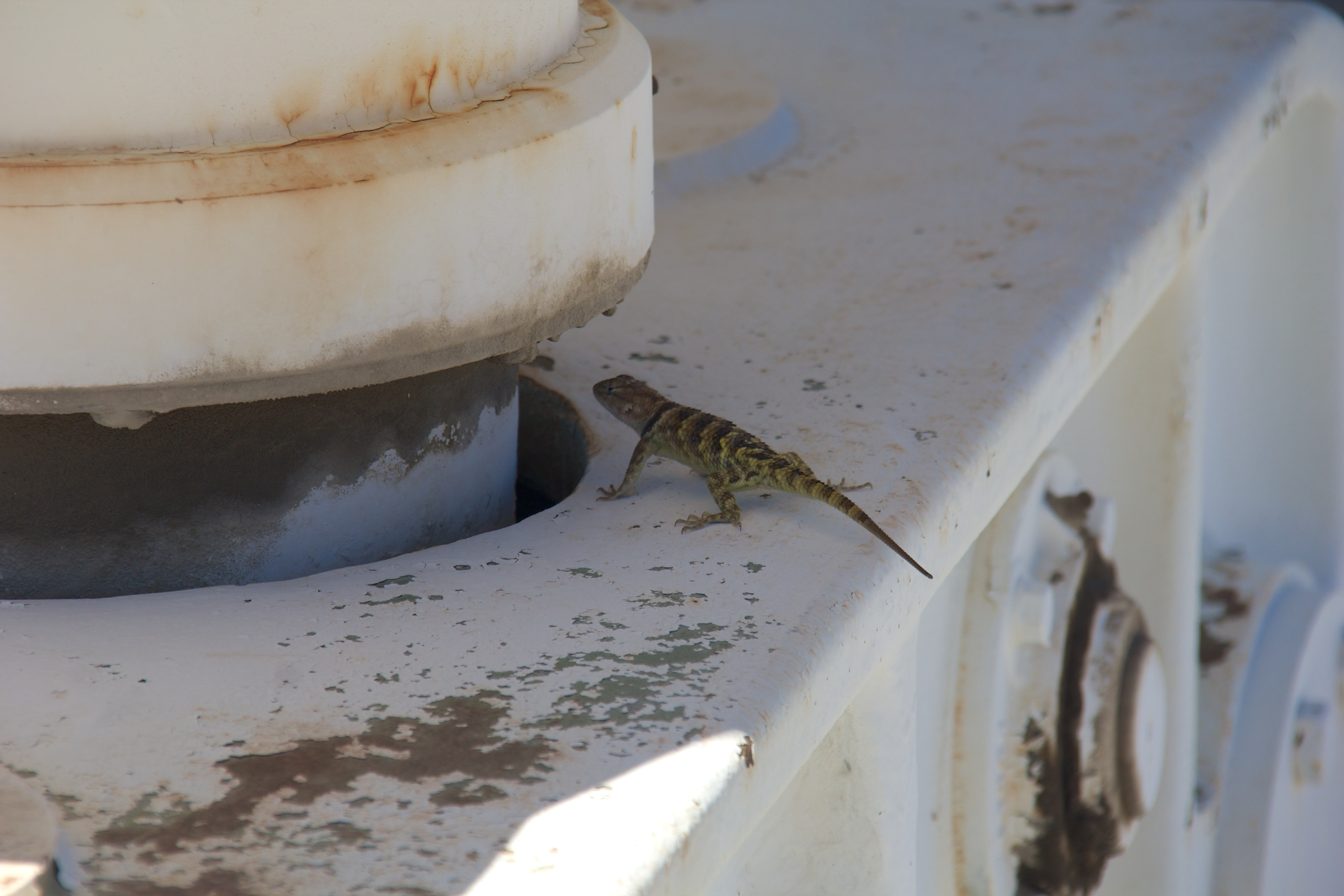
On the OVRO 40 meter Telescope

This lizard is native to the Mojave, Great Basin, and San Joaquin deserts. It is endemic to the United States, and can be found in California, Nevada, Utah, and Arizona. S. uniformis can be found living in desert flats, semiarid plains, low mountain slopes, and riparian woods.

Although S. uniformis is primarily an ambush predator, on occasion it will actively forage. This species will eat a variety of small invertebrates and their larvae including ants, beetles, grasshoppers, spiders, centipedes, and caterpillars. Occasionally, small lizards, nestling birds, leaves, flowers and berries are also consumed.

== Behavior ==
Like many desert species, S. uniformis basks in the morning on rocks or any hard surface that is in direct sunlight. It will seek shelter, usually underground in burrows, during the hottest part of the day in the summertime. It hibernates in late fall and during the cold months of winter before re-emerging in spring.
