= DSA-110 =

Radio telescope array

The Deep Synoptic Array 110, or DSA-110 is a radio telescope located at the Owens Valley Radio Observatory in California. The main goal is the study of fast radio bursts, or FRBs. The telescope is an array of 110 dishes, each 4.65 meters in diameter. They continuously survey for FRBs at frequencies in the range of 1280–1530 MHz. A real-time pipeline searches the data from the 95 element core array to generate alerts, and also triggers recordings of the array and 15 outrigger antennas for the purpose of off-line (but more accurate) localization. The project is funded by the National Science Foundation.

== Relation to the other DSA telescopes ==
In many ways, the DSA-110 is a successor to the smaller DSA-10, and a precursor to the larger and more powerful Deep Synoptic Array, which will have 1650 fully steerable (as opposed to the DSA-110's elevation only) 6.15 meter dishes. Both the DSA-110 and the full DSA use the same ambient temperature receiver technology, with fiber optic transmission to a central processing facility. The larger DSA, however, has a different main purpose, acting as a radio camera to create an archive of full sky images.

=== Ambient temperature receiver ===
Traditional radio telescope receivers have required cooling (often to cryogenic temperatures) to get low enough noise to be useful for astronomical observations. This typically resulted in a cost of at least $100,000 per receiver, making arrays with a large number of antennas impractical. However, recent developments in indium phosphide technology have resulting in transistors with a low enough noise figure at room temperature to remove the need for cooling.

== Uses ==
Over a three-year science program, the DSA-110 is expected to localize more than 300 FRBs to better than 3 arcseconds (<1/1000 of a degree). This seems plausible as during commissioning, with 63 antennas active, more than one FRB per week was localized.

DSA-110 maintains a website with science results to date.
