= Bruny Island Radio Spectrometer =

Radio telescope

- Location: Tasmania, AUS
- Coordinates: 42°22′12″S 147°13′05″E
- Wavelength: 4.8 m (62 MHz)–25 m (12 MHz)
- Website: fourier.phys.utas.edu.au/birs/
- Location within Australia

Bruny Island Radio Specrometer, or BIRS, was a radio telescope on Bruny Island that was operated privately by Bill Erickson, who was then a research associate at the University of Tasmania. It was designed to measure relatively low frequency radio emissions from the sun; ranging from around 62 MHz down to the lowest possible frequencies that can penetrate the ionosphere, which typically fluctuates between 7 and 13 MHz, but can be as low as 3 MHz. Reliable measurements below 20 MHz are difficult to obtain with ground-based telescopes due to interference, both from local sources and distant ones. BIRS' main purpose was to detect and study coronal type II radio bursts, but has on occasion also measured radio bursts below 3 MHz believed to have originated from Jupiter. In January 2015, BIRS' sustained a hardware failure and has stopped publishing data.

Bruny Island, a small island off the southwest coast of Tasmania, was chosen as a location because the low frequency ionospheric cutoff is unusually low in the region and there is relatively little local interference.

The antenna was a 21.4m mast that supported two triangular frames with 23 dipoles ranging from 3.05 to 50 m and spaced log-periodically, diminishing in distance from a maximum 2.75 m between dipoles. Signal processing equipment was located in a nearby laboratory connected to the antenna by coaxial cable.

Because of the large amounts of interference that can affect BIRS' measurements, several methods had to be employed to process the data. Data had to first be fed to a preamplifier and slope filter to prevent interference from overloading the signal and drowning out the desired information. The signal could then be amplified and fed to a commercially bought spectrum analyzer which selects 128 relatively interference free frequencies to observe every 3 seconds for half an hour. The frequencies below 20 MHz are largely used for international communications, so the system needed to adapt its filters every half an hour to effectively remove the interference. The antenna used the galactic background radiation for calibration. The BIRS is oriented to point almost directly at the galactic south pole, so background is measured at that point for calibration.

The Bruny Island Radio Spectrometer was one of the first attempts for a terrestrial radio telescope operating at frequencies lower than 20 MHz, and systems demonstrated in BIRS would eventually be integrated into other radio spectrometers. The Green Bank Solar Radio Burst Spectrometer was designed to use a similar spectrometer and data processing unit to BIRS. The Long Wavelength Array (LWA) was 'inspired by Bill Erickson's historical legacy' and BIRS is considered a predecessor to LWA according to the University of New Mexico. Bill Erickson was awarded the inaugural Grote Reber medal in 2005, in part for his significant contributions to metre wavelength telescopes with projects like BIRS.

== See also ==
- List of radio telescopes
