= Deep Synoptic Array =

Radio telescope array

- Alternative names: DSA
- Location(s): Spring Valley, Lincoln County, Nevada
- Organization: California Institute of Technology
- Wavelength: 0.7, 2.0 GHz (43, 15 cm)
- First light: c. 2029
- Website: www.deepsynoptic.org

The Deep Synoptic Array (DSA) is a radio telescope array that will contain 1,650 steerable 6.15-metre (20 ft 2 in) parabolic antennas that observe the 0.7–2 GHz frequency range, scattered over an area of 19 by 15 kilometres (12 mi × 9 mi). The main goal is a radio survey of the entire sky visible from its site, to search for transient sources. A secondary goal is pulsar timing, to aid in the search for gravitational waves.

The project is managed by the California Institute of Technology (Caltech) as part of their Owens Valley Radio Observatory, with funding provided by Schmidt Sciences. It is expected to be operational in 2029.

== Description ==
The DSA will contain 1,650 steerable 6.15-metre (20 ft 2 in) parabolic antennas which cover the 0.7–2 GHz frequency range, scattered over an area of 19 by 15 kilometres (12 mi × 9 mi). This gives a total collecting area of about 49,000 square meters, about the same as one 250 meter dish, or roughly equivalent to the active collecting area of the now-defunct Arecibo Telescope.

The DSA incorporates two main technical advances, both related to its architecture of a large number of small antennas. The first is that having a large number of randomly distributed antennas makes it much easier to convert the radio signals into images. This strategy had never been practical before, since antennas sensitive enough for radio astronomy historically required cooling to very low temperatures, which made each antenna too expensive to build such a large array. Therefore the second enabling advance is a receiver, using modern semiconductor technology, that can achieve the needed sensitivity without cooling.

Because the individual antennas are small, the DSA has a large instantaneous field of view of 11 square degrees. The large field of view is critical to its use for a sky survey, and is comparable to that the Vera C. Rubin Observatory, which will be performing a similar sky survey in the optical wavelengths. The resolution is determined by the size of the array, and is about 3 arc-seconds at 1.5 GHz.

== Location ==
The DSA is planned to be constructed in Spring Valley, Nevada. This location was chosen for a variety of reasons. It is big enough to hold the array (which must be 15 x 19 km to achieve the desired spatial resolution) and at high elevation, important for tropospheric conditions. It has a very low population density and has near-complete shielding from (ground-based) external RFI. The soil is conducive for plowing under the required fiber-optic cables, and the site has existing infrastructure (roads and utility power), which allow for the least amount of environmental disturbance.

The DSA is being managed and built by Caltech.

== History ==
DSA was proposed in 2019, where it was envisaged as an all-sky radio survey instrument complementary to the Very Large Array, and as a counterpart to the Vera C. Rubin Observatory (optical), SPHEREx (near-infrared) and SRG/eROSITA (X-ray) all-sky surveys.

The DSA Prototype, the DSA-10 and the DSA-110 were earlier efforts that demonstrated many of the needed technologies. However these efforts were not as general-purpose, and performed specialized tasks such as detecting and localizing fast radio bursts. Although the DSA-110 predecessor was funded by the National Science Foundation, the larger DSA is financed by Schmidt Sciences, the philanthropic organization of the billionaire and former Google CEO Eric Schmidt. It is expected to be operational in 2029.

=== Easier imaging ===
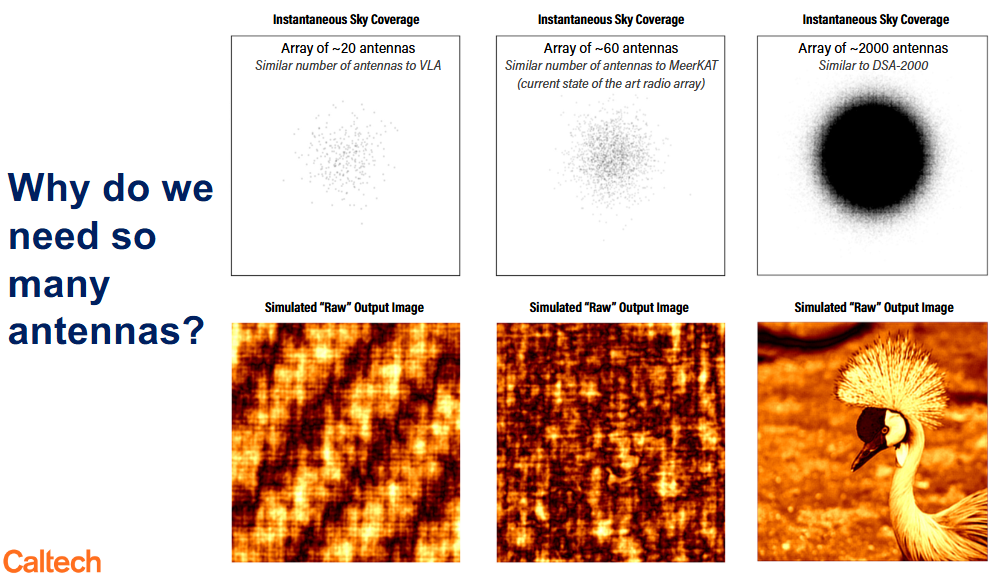
Visual illustration of why a large number of telescopes make image reconstruction easier.

Traditional radio telescope arrays have been built with a relatively small number of relatively large antennas (the VLA, for example, has 27 dishes of 25 meters diameter). A small number of antennas generates a sparsely-sampled uv-plane, as each antenna pair generates one point in this plane. Thus a 20 element array will specify about 200 points, a 60 element array about 1800 points, but the DSA will generate about 2 million points, as shown on the left. These point counts will, very roughly, correspond to pixel counts in a naively reconstructed image. This situation is illustrated by the figure on the left - on top are the sampled uv planes assuming two traditional radio telescope antenna counts, and the DSA. The bottom row shows the result of naive inversion of the corresponding point spread functions, shown for illustration applied to an everyday nature photograph.

From this figure it is clear that telescopes with sparse uv plane coverage (basically all radio telescopes up until now) require considerable post-processing to generate useful images. In particular, additional non-linear constraints (such as positivity) must be assumed, both vastly complicating the aperture synthesis calculations and making them dependent on the particular assumptions used. In turn the need for complex processing requires huge data storage and transport requirements, since if images are not computed in real time, then the raw data (or the visibilities, the correlations between pairs of antennas) need to be saved and delivered to the end user for later post-processing.

The DSA, in comparison, will have near-complete sampling of the uv-plane, as show in the top figure on the right. A large number of randomly located antennas samples a huge number of baselines (roughly n^{2}/2 of them), each of a different length and orientation. This results in a comparatively dense sampling of the uv-plane, and gives a native point spread function which is sufficiently good that much-less-complex algorithms can be used to create images, as shown in the figure on the bottom right. This simpler calculation can be performed in real time, acting as a "radio camera". The storage savings from computing images in real time, and not saving the raw data or the visibilities, are quite large: 20 exabytes of visibility data/year will produce roughly a petabyte of images per year, so a factor of 20,000 less data needs to be stored.

=== Ambient temperature receiver ===
Traditional radio telescope receivers have required cooling (often to cryogenic temperatures) to achieve sufficiently low noise to enable sensitive astronomical observations. This typically resulted in a cost of at least $100,000 per receiver, making arrays with a large number of antennas impractical. However, recent developments in indium phosphide technology have resulted in transistors with a low-enough noise figure at room temperature to remove the need for cooling of the input low-noise amplifier (LNA). In addition, very low loss feed horns and matching networks are required, since any losses before the LNA contribute directly to system noise temperature in proportion to their physical temperature.

== Uses and data products ==
Since the DSA digitizes the whole 0.7–2.0 GHz bandwidth, processing in software can simultaneously generate radio images at many different frequency resolutions for different purposes. The spatial resolution of images is 3.5 arcseconds. The frequency domain outputs of the radio camera are:

- 10 channels, intensity only, spanning the full bandwidth
- 605 channels (2.15 MHz resolution) with polarization data
- 2,048 channels, intensity only, 1.05 kHz resolution, around the HI line of neutral hydrogen (1,420 MHz). These images will allow the study of neutral hydrogen within our galaxy at a Doppler resolution of 0.22 km/sec.
- 4,096 channels, intensity only, 8 kHz resolution, again near the HI line. These images are for analysis of "nearby" galaxies (those within 100 megaparsecs) with a Doppler resolution of 1.8 km/sec.
- 5,600 channels, 0.7–1.45 GHz (resolution 135 kHz), to be used for studying neutral hydrogen emission out to redshift Z = 1. Z = 1 is the limit of this telescope, as beyond that redshift drops the neutral hydrogen frequency below the lower frequency limit of the telescope.

Although the main goal of DSA is a sky survey, it will pursue other projects as well. Operations other than radio imaging (such as pulsar timing and searches for transients) are possible as the signal processing is programmable since it is implemented in general purpose FPGAs and GPUs.

- 65% of the observing time will be used for the sky survey. In a five-year initial survey, the DSA will image the entire sky viewable from the site (~31,000 square degrees of the total celestial sphere of 41,253 square degrees) 16 times over 5 years. These images will include both polarization and spectral information from 0.7 to 2 GHz. This survey is expected to increase the number of known radio sources by a factor of at least 100.
- 25% of the observing time will be used to collect pulsar timing data, looking for nanoHertz gravitational waves in collaboration with the NANOGrav collaboration.
- 10% of the observing time will be used to conduct daily observations of select fields. These observations, in particular, will overlap with the deep fields of the Vera C. Rubin Observatory, which will be doing optical observations at the same time, an example of multi-messenger astronomy.

All data will be publicly available with no proprietary period. Public data from the Deep Synoptic Array will be hosted at the NASA/IPAC Infrared Science Archive (IRSA). This is somewhat unusual for a radio telescope, but makes sense since the DSA produces images, not the traditional radio telescope data products. The existing IRSA holdings are primarily images in other bands from projects such as IRAS, WISE, 2MASS, and Planck.

== See also ==
- International Pulsar Timing Array
- Very Large Array
