= OVRO 40 meter Telescope =

Radio telescope in California

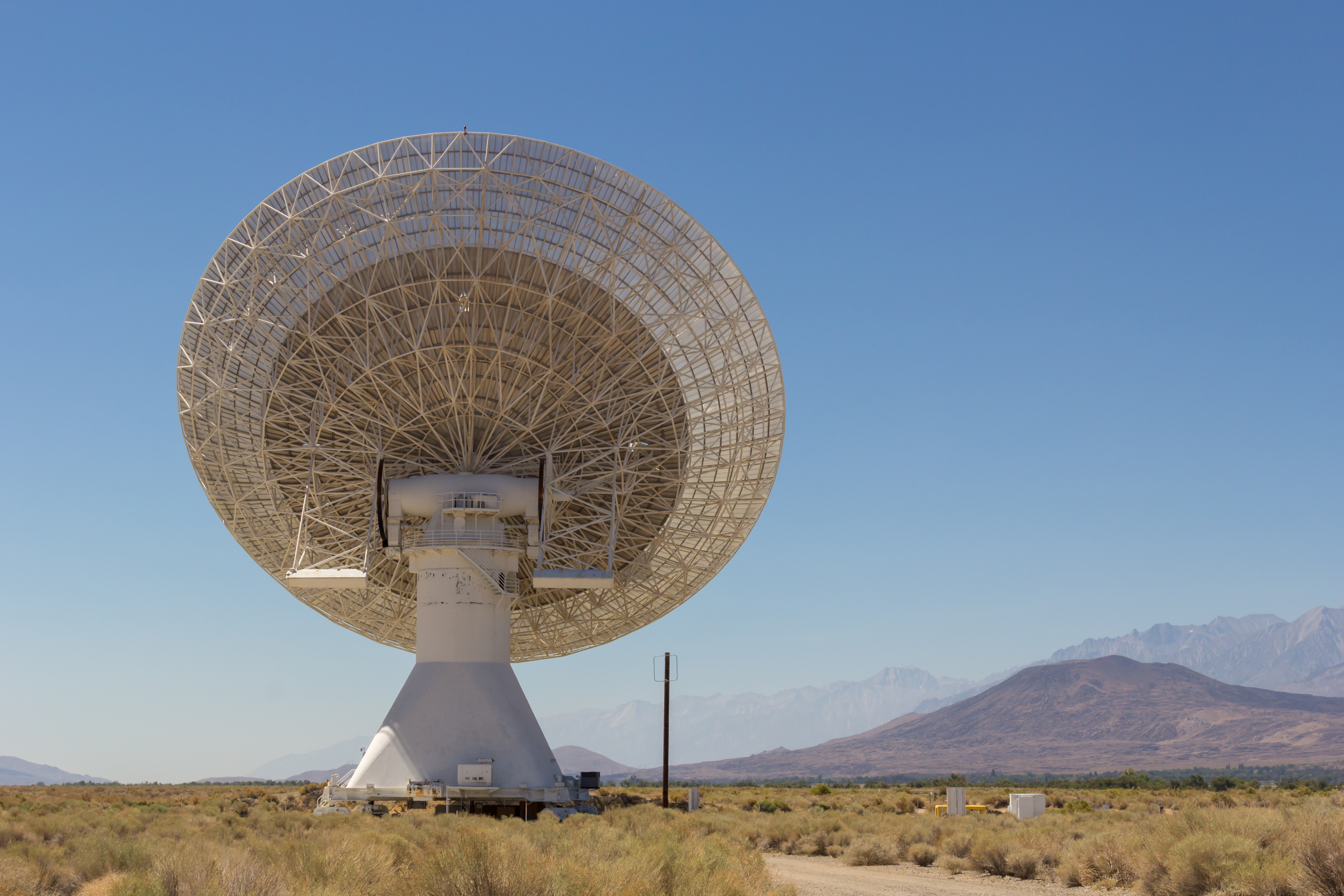
- Location: California, Pacific States Region
- Coordinates: 37°14′00″N 118°17′02″W
- Diameter: 40 m (131 ft 3 in)
- Website: www.ovro.caltech.edu
- Location within the United States
- Related media on Commons

The OVRO 40 meter Telescope is a radio telescope at the Owens Valley Radio Observatory near Big Pine, California, US. It is owned and operated by Caltech. The telescope is easily visible from the section of US highway 395 just north of Big Pine.

== History ==
Construction of the telescope was funded by the National Science Foundation, as a prototype for a planned astronomical interferometer at Owens Valley. The interferometer was to incorporate eight dishes moving on rails, positioned up to 5 miles (8.0 km) apart. The 40-metre (130 ft) diameter prototype was completed in 1968, but by the end of the decade plans for the interferometer were cancelled in favour of the Very Large Array.

The newly-constructed prototype was instead combined with existing telescopes at Owens Valley to form a smaller interferometer, with maximum baseline of 0.75 miles (1.21 km). Starting in 1969, it was also sometimes used as a very long baseline interferometry (VLBI) station, in conjunction with more distant observatories. When operating with the Parkes telescope in Australia it provided the longest baseline then available in the world, and hence the highest angular resolution of 0.4 milliarcseconds. VLBI operations continued until 1991, when they were retired in favour of the more capable Very Long Baseline Array.

== Current use ==
In 2007 the telescope was re-purposed for a dedicated blazar monitoring campaign, in support of the Fermi Gamma-ray Space Telescope which launched in 2008 and observes blazars in gamma rays. As of 2018 the telescope takes regular measurements of over 1800 blazars, by observing each one at 15 gigahertz (2.0 cm) twice a week.

== In popular culture ==
Much of the 1996 film The Arrival was filmed at Owens Valley Radio Observatory, and the climactic fight scene occurred in, and on the primary mirror of, the 40 meter telescope.

== See also ==
- List of observatories
