= Leighton Radio Telescopes =

Type of dish antenna designed in the 1970s

The Leighton Radio Telescopes are 10.4 meter parabolic dish antennas designed by Robert B. Leighton in the 1970s, which were fabricated on the Caltech campus during the 1970s and 1980s. The telescope surfaces reached an accuracy of 10 microns RMS, allowing observations throughout the millimeter and submillimeter bands. In all, eight of these telescopes were made. They were used as the six elements of the Owens Valley Radio Observatory (OVRO) millimeter interferometer in California, and as single telescopes at the Caltech Submillimeter Observatory in Hawaii and the Raman Research Institute (RRI) at Bangalore, India. In the spring of 2005, the six Leighton telescopes in Owens Valley were moved to a high mountain site in the White Mountains to form the core of the CARMA array of 25 telescopes. The CARMA array was decommissioned in 2015 at which time the Leighton telescopes were moved back to OVRO, where they are now being repurposed for different projects including the CO Mapping Array Pathfinder (COMAP) (a 19 pixel imaging array), the Event Horizon Telescope (EHT), and various transient detection projects.

== Origins ==
In 1973 Robert Leighton proposed to the NSF to build four 10.4 meter diameter parabolic dish radio antennas. Three of the antennas were to be used as a millimeter-wave interferometer to be sited at OVRO, and the fourth was to be used as a single submillimeter telescope at a high mountain site. The proposal was approved (AST 73–04908), and total funding was $477,700.

Schematic of the telescope mount

== The Mount ==
The telescopes have an altazimuth fork mount. The azimuth axis is an inverted circular cone, the apex of which is supported by a thrust bearing. Cam-follower roller bearings mounted around the top of the base push against the top of the inverted cone to complete the azimuth axis constraint. There is a cable wrap for signal and power wiring which rides atop the azimuth thrust bearing. On the top of the cone is the azimuth platform, which supports two elevation bearings. The elevation tipping platform that supports the primary reflector is driven in elevation by a rotating ball-screw.

The azimuth platform is large enough to allow several people to work on it. It also houses a small sidecab room to the right of the right elevation bearing, which houses the Nasmyth focus radio receivers (typically SIS receivers). The sidecab also houses electronics for the axis encoders, LO & IF systems and tiltmeters along with the antenna control computer.

Three motors drive the telescope, two in azimuth and one in elevation. An offset in the drive voltage is maintained between the azimuth motors, in order to prevent backlash when driving the 1.74 meter diameter bull gear. The telescopes can slew at a rate of 40 degrees per minute.

== Optics ==
The 10.4 meter primary mirror has a 0.4 focal ratio. The hyperboloid secondary mirror is 0.606 meters in diameter, and directs the light to either a Cassegrain focus or a Nasmyth focus, depending upon whether or not a tertiary mirror is present. The telescope has an effective focal ratio of 12.4 at the Cassegrain focus, which is located at the point of intersection of the azimuth and elevations axes.

== The Dish ==
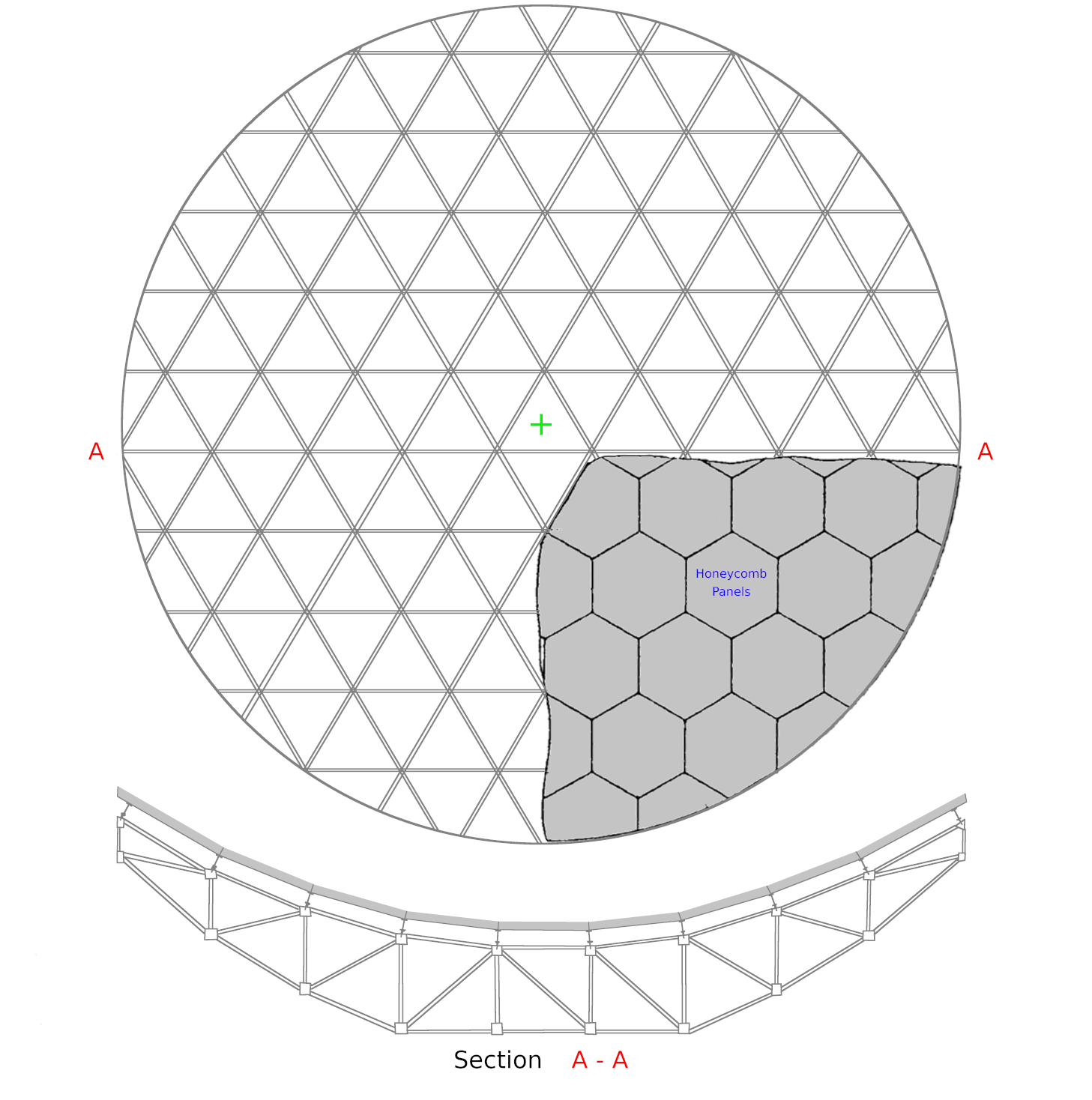
Top: A Leighton dish seen from above. The hexagonal surface plates are supported by a space frame, which appears as equilateral triangles when viewed along the optical axis. Bottom: A cross section of the support space frame structure spanning the points marked A in the upper figure.

The primary mirror, usually called the dish, is composed of 84 panels which are hexagonal when projected onto the aperture plane (the RRI dish had 81 panels). Each panel is approximately 1.15 meters across. The panel that would have tiled the center of the dish is absent, providing the hole required for Cassegrain and Nasmyth foci. Panels near the edge of the dish are irregularly shaped, and in some cases larger than the nominal size, in order to tile the circular aperture without needing any very small panels. The mirror is 92% homologous, maintaining a nearly parabolic shape with only the focal point changing when the mirror deforms due to gravity as the telescope elevation changes. Deviations from homology are less than 17 microns RMS over the telescope's entire elevation range. These focus changes are compensated for by moving the secondary mirror laterally and along the optical axis.

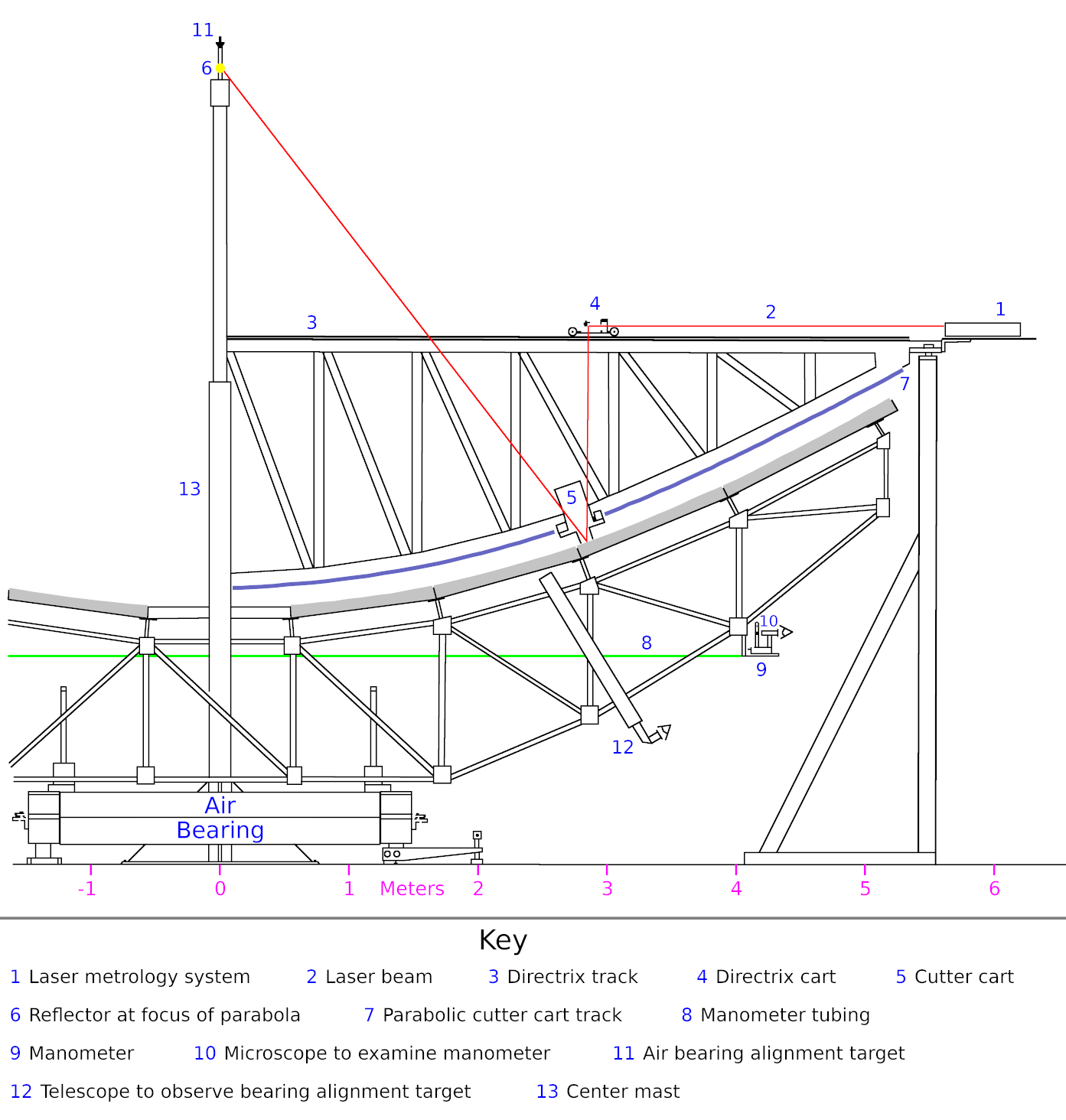
The machinery used to shape the primary reflector.

A unique feature of the Leighton telescopes is that the primary is fabricated as a single 10.4 m diameter precision surface, rather than individually machined panels. The dish panels are made of a lightweight (15 kg/m^{3}) aluminum honeycomb material with vertical channels. To produce the reflector's parabolic shape, the panels were assembled atop the same steel tube space frame that will support the panels on the deployed telescope. The space frame was mounted on an air bearing surrounding a central mast. An arm extended from the central mast, which had a parabolic track on the bottom side. The parabolic track was shaped by a laser metrology system that made use of the fact that a parabola is the locus of points equidistant from the focal point and a directrix line. The directrix in this case was the upper side of the arm. After the parabolic track was created, a cutting tool moved along the track, and cut the honeycomb panels as the dish rotated on the air bearing. After the honeycomb panels were cut to the proper parabolic shape, an aluminum skin was applied to each panel, to provide the dish's reflecting surface.

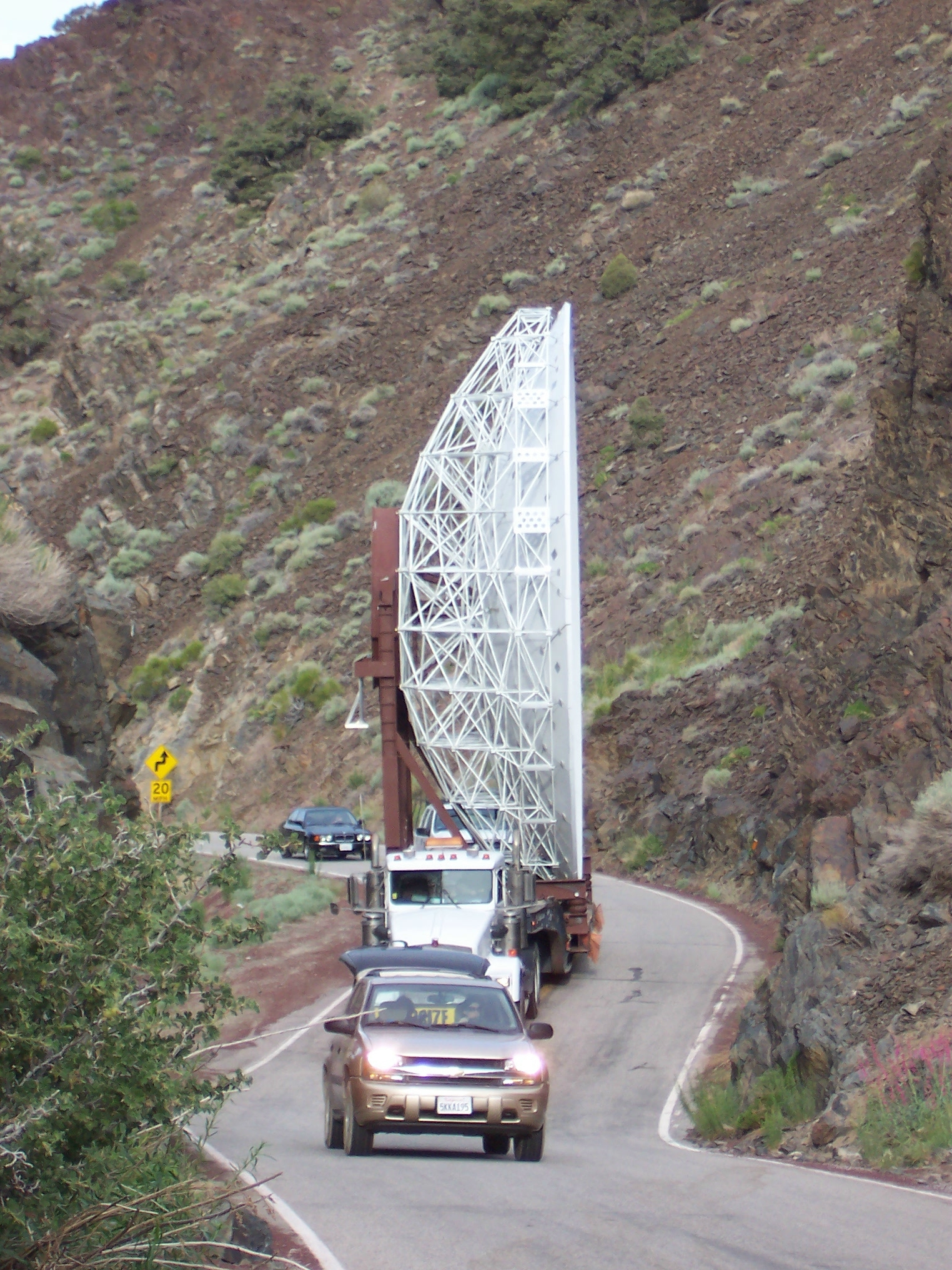
A fully assembled Leighton Dish being moved to CARMA

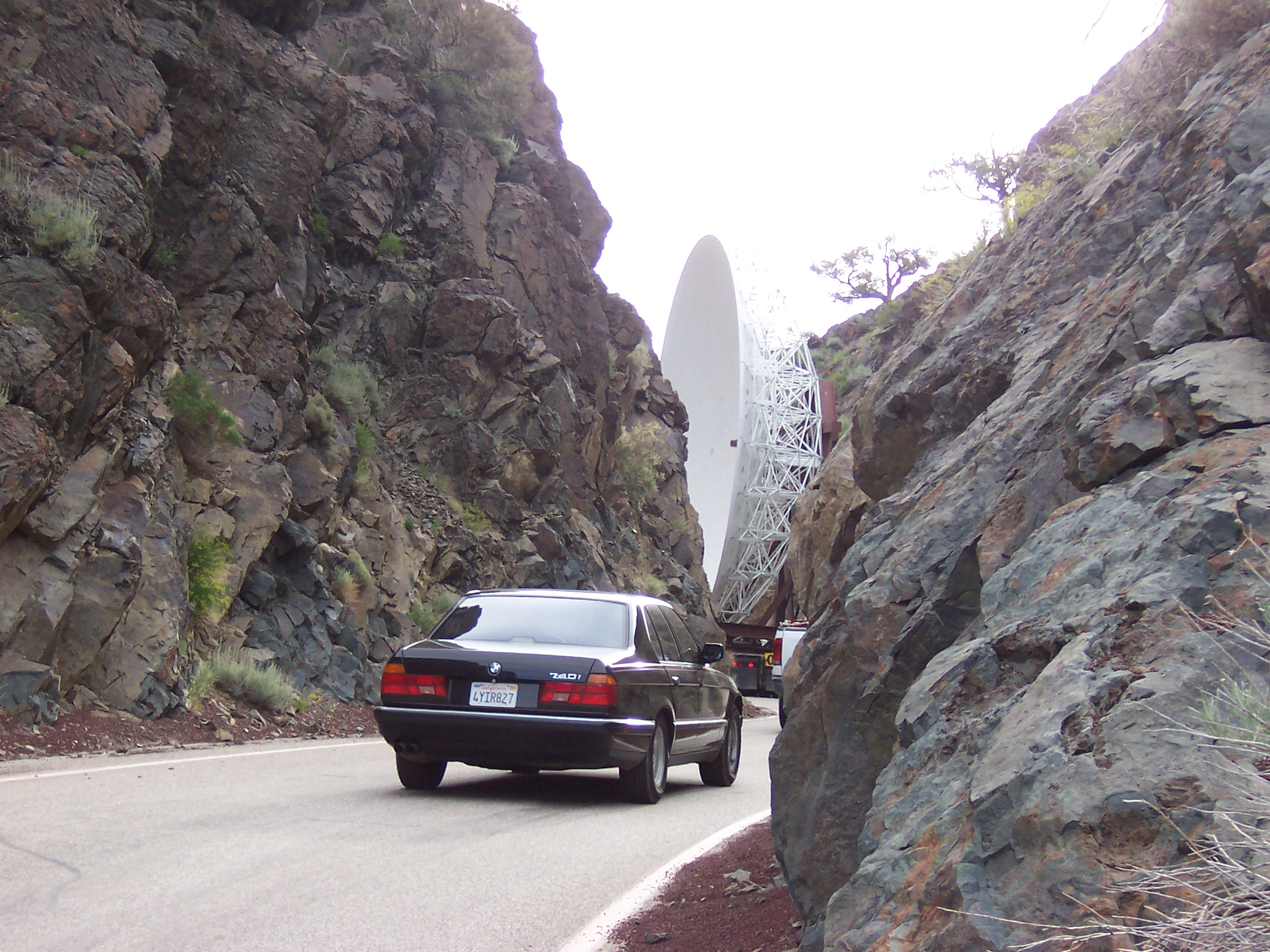
One of the Leighton dishes being driven on a mountain road, through a slot canyon, on its journey from OVRO to the CARMA site in June, 2015

The space frame is fabricated from steel tubes less than 1.5 m long that have holes on each end for inserting dowel pins. The spacing between the holes is achieved with an accuracy of 10 microns. A single person can assemble the space frame on the air bearing in a few days. This concept was developed as part of a study of how a large telescope could be assembled by astronauts in space. The precision dowel pin joint also made it possible to perform accurate finite element analysis (FEA) using the computers available in the 1970s. This allowed iteration of the design tube cross-sections to improve the homology performance. During the machining of the surface, the space frame was supported kinematically on three primary points. The dowel pin joint space frame was designed to allow the dish, including panels, to be disassembled after fabrication into large sections (typically three) and transported to the observatory site, without significantly degrading the optical quality of the dish. The primary is placed on the tipping platform supported at the same three primary support points without introducing any new stresses. Six more points are fastened to the tipping platform to transfer the stiffness of the tipping platform to the space frame. Shims are used at the additional six attachment points to ensure that they do not stress the space frame while looking zenith. This is a critical part of the success of assembling the primary reflector onto the tipping platform and has been exploited when moving the telescopes to CARMA high mountain site and back to the valley.

All of the dishes, except for the one on the RRI telescope, were fabricated in the Synchrotron Building near the south-east corner of the Caltech campus; the building which was built to accommodate the equipment needed to polish the Hale Telescope 200 inch mirror nearly a half century earlier. The dish and mount for the RRI telescope were fabricated at National Aerospace Laboratories, with final assembly done in the RRI library.

== Deployment ==
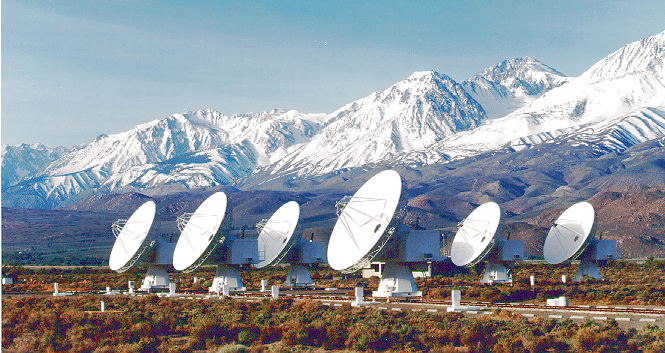
The OVRO Millimeter Array antennas shown with California's Sierra Nevada mountains in the background

The first three telescopes were deployed at the OVRO for testing as a millimeter wave interferometer. After the initial three element array was dedicated in 1985, three more antennas were added to the array to produce a six element interferometer. Fabrication of the second set of three OVRO antennas was overseen by David Woody, following Robert Leighton's retirement. Five of the six OVRO antennas were funded by the NSF, and the Kenneth and Eileen Norris Foundation paid for the sixth, which was dedicated in 1996. In 2005 these six telescopes were moved to the Cedar Flat in the Inyo Mountains of California, and added to the CARMA array. The CARMA array ceased operation in 2015, and the six Leighton telescopes were moved back to OVRO for storage. One of these six antennas is now being used as the CO Mapping Array Pathfinder telescope.

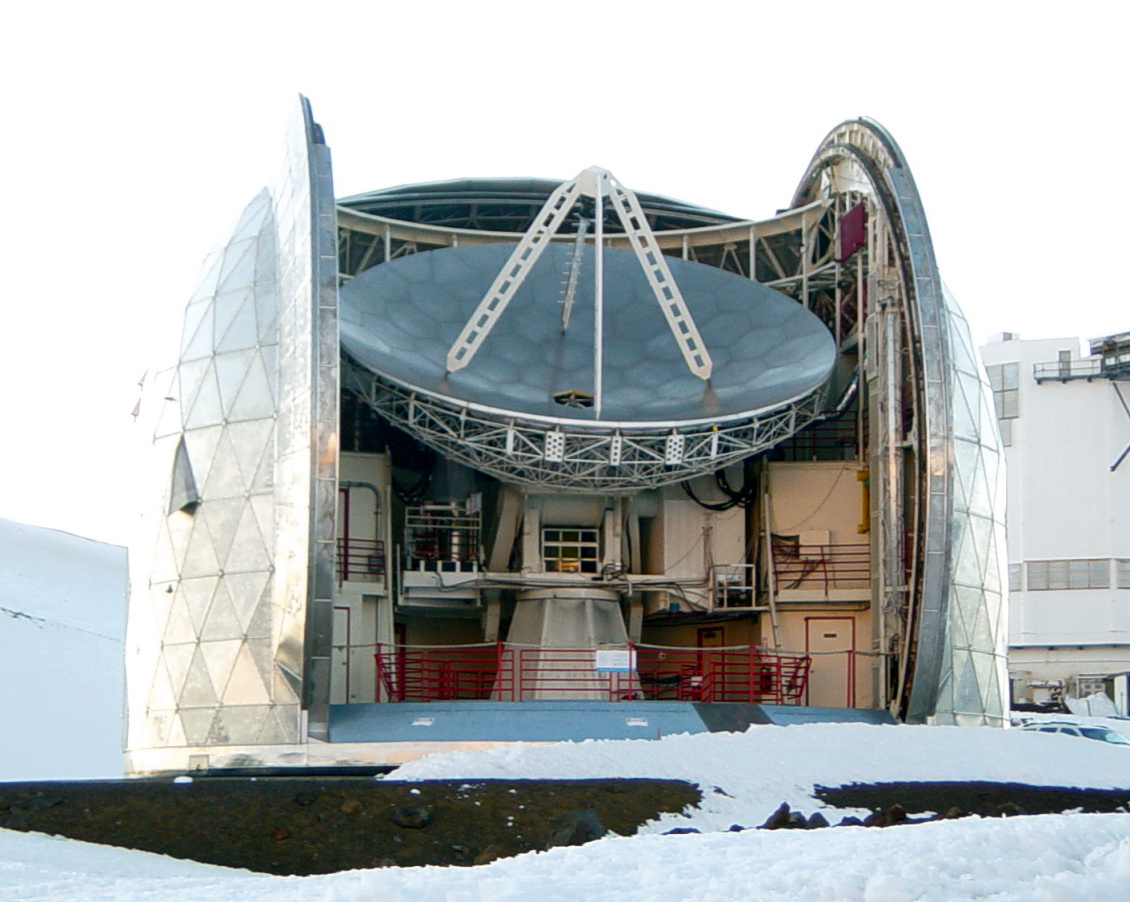
The Leighton dish with the most accurate surface was used for the Caltech Submillimeter Observatory

The Leighton telescope with the most accurate (10 micron RMS) surface was shipped to Mauna Kea, Hawaii, and became the Caltech Submillimeter Observatory. This telescope was named the "Leighton Telescope" after the death of Robert Leighton in 1997. Unique among the Leighton telescopes, this unit had active control of the surface by means of heating elements added to the standoff pins supporting the surface panels.

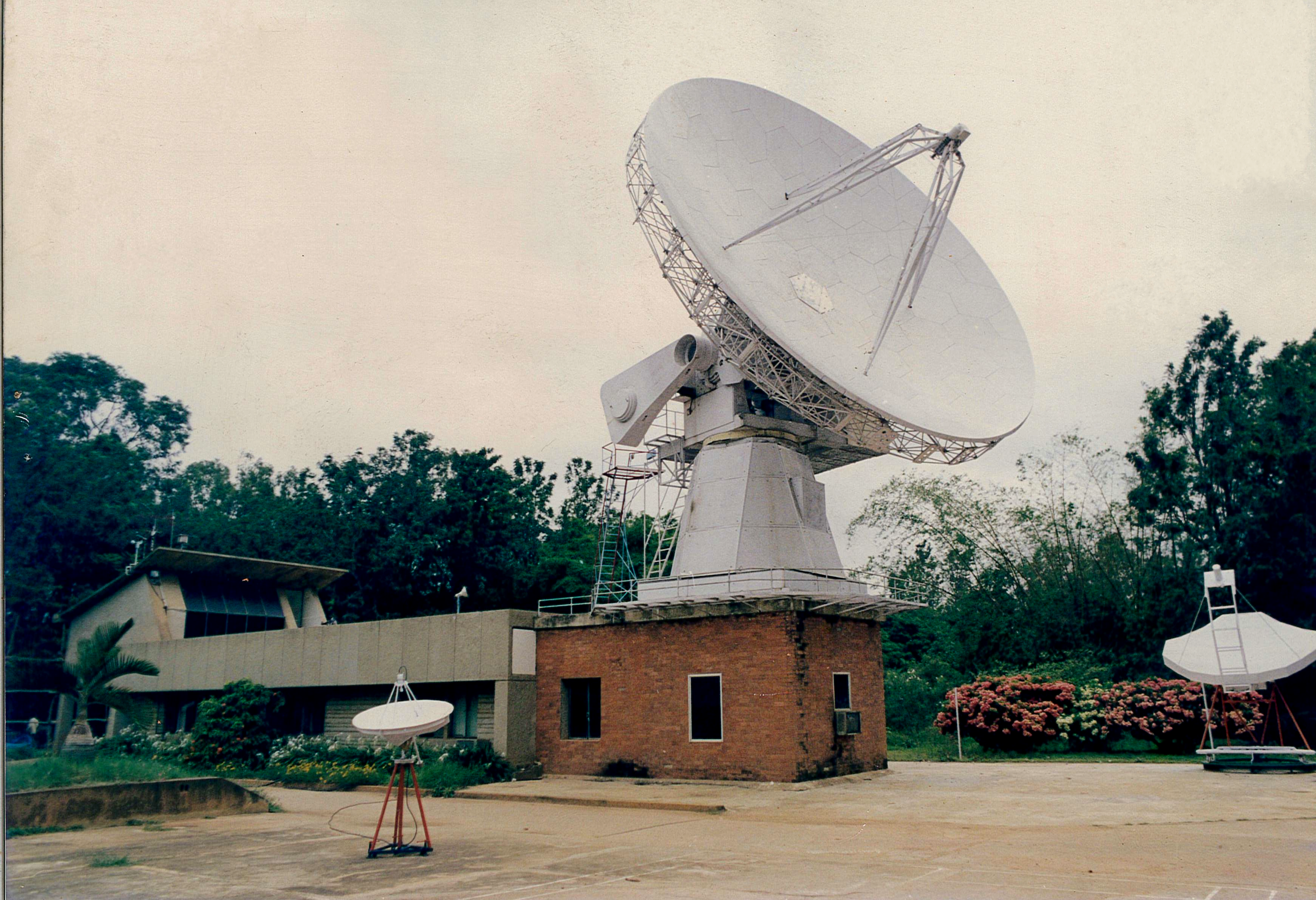
The Leighton-style telescope at the Raman Research Institute. The grey building to the left housed the telescope's control room.

Another Leighton telescope was located in India at the Raman Research Institute. Although it followed the Leighton design fairly closely, it differs from all others because it was completely fabricated and assembled in India. It was also the only Leighton telescope which used prime focus receivers (in addition to receivers at the other foci). The telescope was placed atop a building which housed its IF system electronics and filter bank spectrometers. Operations began in 1988 with observations of SiO maser emission at 86 GHz from Mira-type variable stars. In 1993 its surface accuracy was reported to be 120 microns RMS. By 2009 the surface had degraded; holographic measurements at 12 GHz showed that the surface had a 350 micron RMS accuracy, but the surface still allowed observations at frequencies as high as 43 GHz with a 50% aperture efficiency. The telescope was decommissioned around 2012.

== See also ==
- Caltech Submillimeter Observatory
- Combined Array for Research in Millimeter-wave Astronomy
- Robert B. Leighton
