= Owens Valley Radio Observatory =

Astronomical observatory in California, USA

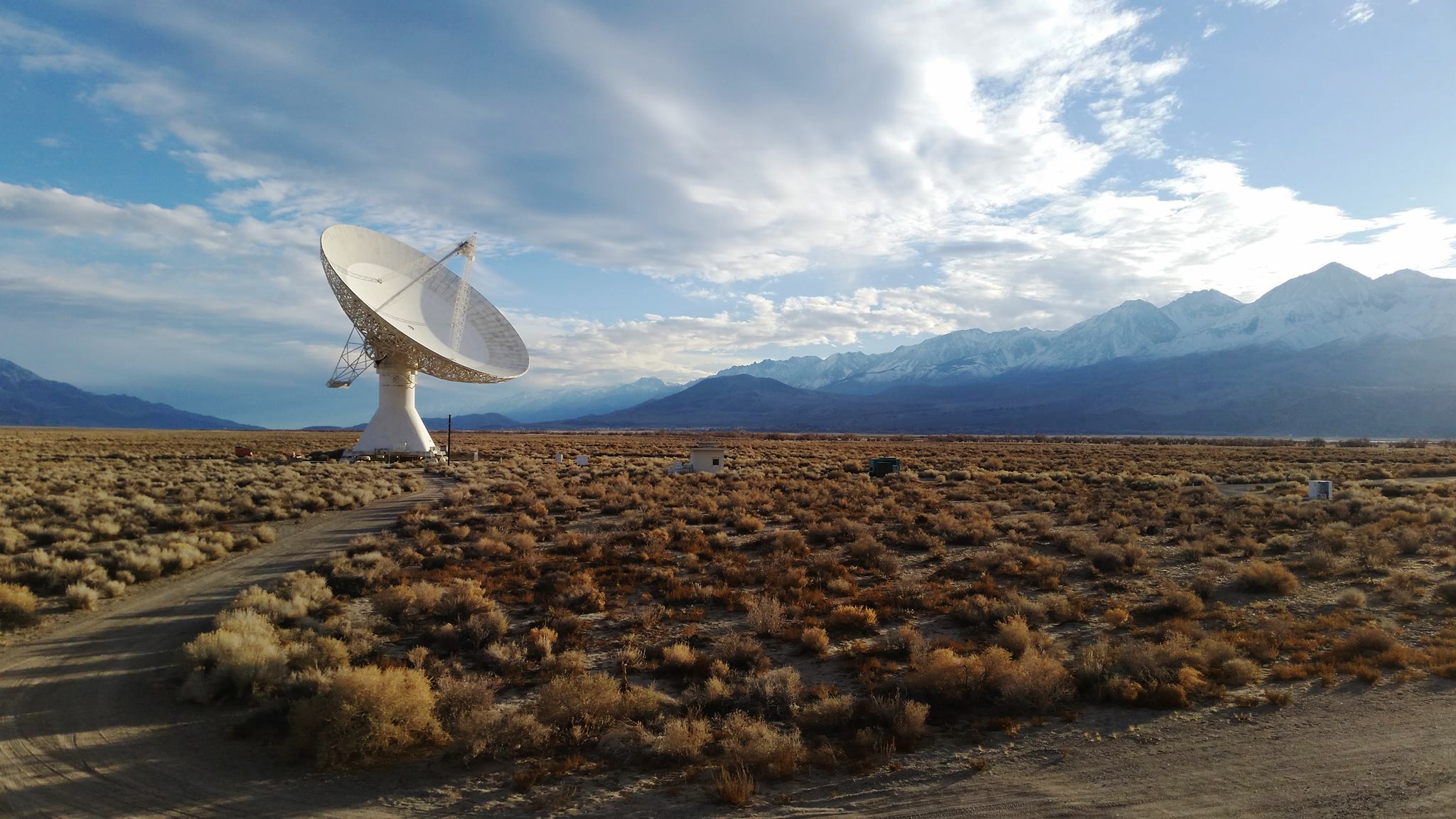
- Alternative names: OVRO
- Organization: California Institute of Technology; New Jersey Institute of Technology
- Location: Owens Valley, Inyo County, California, Pacific States Region
- Coordinates: 37°14′02″N 118°16′55″W
- Altitude: 1,222 m (4,009 ft)
- Established: 1958
- Website: www.ovro.caltech.edu
- Telescopes: DSA-110; Long Wavelength Array; OVRO 40 meter Telescope; Owens Valley Solar Array
- Related media on Commons

Owens Valley Radio Observatory (OVRO) is a radio astronomy observatory located near Big Pine, California (US) in Owens Valley. It lies east of the Sierra Nevada, approximately 350 kilometers (220 miles) north of Los Angeles and 20 kilometers (12 miles) southeast of Bishop. It was established in 1956, and is owned and operated by the California Institute of Technology (Caltech). The Owens Valley Solar Array portion of the observatory has been operated by New Jersey Institute of Technology (NJIT) since 1997.

One of the ten dish-antenna radiotelescope systems of the Very Long Baseline Array is located on a sublease within the Owens Valley observatory.

== About ==
The Owens Valley Radio Observatory (OVRO), one of the largest university-operated radio observatories in the world, has its origins in the late 1940s with three individuals: Lee DuBridge, president of California Institute of Technology (Caltech); Robert Bacher, chairman of the Division of Physics, Mathematics and Astronomy; and Jesse Greenstein, professor of astrophysics. In 1954, Caltech occupied a central position in the American radio astronomy program. John Bolton and Gordon Stanley, two respected Australian astronomers, joined the Caltech faculty in order to undertake the construction of large dishes. In 1956 the first radio telescope, a 32-foot (9.8 m) antenna, was erected on Palomar Mountain. It was dismantled in 1958 and transferred to the Owens Valley site. At the same time, two 90-foot (27.4 m) telescopes were completed. Ten years later, an even bigger antenna, a 130-foot (39.6 m) dish was finished. Over the period of 1985 to 1996, a millimeter-wave array was commissioned at OVRO. It consisted of six 34-foot (10.4 m) dishes (also called Leighton's dishes). The millimeter array dishes become part of CARMA when that array was commissioned.

OVRO has used its telescopes and other instruments (listed below) to improve on the locations of radio sources in the sky, to study hydrogen clouds within the Milky Way, galaxy formation, active galactic nuclei ("blazars"), fast radio bursts, and other radioastronomical phenomena. This research is performed by the staff at the observatory with help from professors and post-doctoral students from many institutions. The observatory is different from other radio observatories because of its extensive work with graduate students, who can come to the observatory for long-term observation, benefiting not only the students, but also the observatory as it allows for more comprehensive projects to take place.

== CARMA ==
OVRO staff took a large share of the responsibility for operating CARMA, which was located 20 miles (32 km) east of OVRO in the Inyo Mountains, but was decommissioned in 2015. CARMA was a collaboration between Caltech, University of California Berkeley, University of Illinois, University of Maryland, and University of Chicago to observe space at centimeter and millimeter wavelengths with a 23-element interferometer. CARMA used this interferometer to study the origins of planets, stars and galaxies, as well as to measure the distortions in the cosmic microwave background caused by clusters of galaxies formed soon after the Big Bang.

== Instruments ==
- A Pathfinder instrument for the Carbon Monoxide Mapping Array Project (COMAP) was commissioned in November 2018 to create carbon monoxide intensity maps of the universe between redshifts of 2.4 and 3.4. The COMAP Pathfinder receiver is installed on one of the 10-meter telescopes of the former millimeter array.
- KuPol, or Ku-band Polarimeter, is an instrument that was installed on the OVRO 40 meter Telescope in 2007 and is used to monitor blazars.
- The Expanded Owens Valley Solar Array (EOVSA) is a solar radio telescope array currently in operation at OVRO. It incorporates seven refurbished dishes from OVSA, along with eight new 2 m (6.6 ft) antennas, and one of OVRO's 27-meter telescopes. The small dishes are arranged in a three-arm spiral pattern.
- The Owens Valley Long Wavelength Array, commissioned in 2013, is a duplicate of the Long Wavelength Array in New Mexico. It consists of 352 dipole antennas spread out over a desert area equivalent to about 450 football fields. The OVRO-LWA produces whole-sky radio images in the 30 to 88 megahertz band.
- The Deep Synoptic Array (DSA-10) is an array of 10 4.5 m (15 ft) parabolic radio telescopes currently used to detect and locate Fast Radio Bursts (FRB)s.
- An expanded, 110-element DSA-110 is currently used to study fast radio bursts. It was commissioned in 2023 with 100 operational dishes.

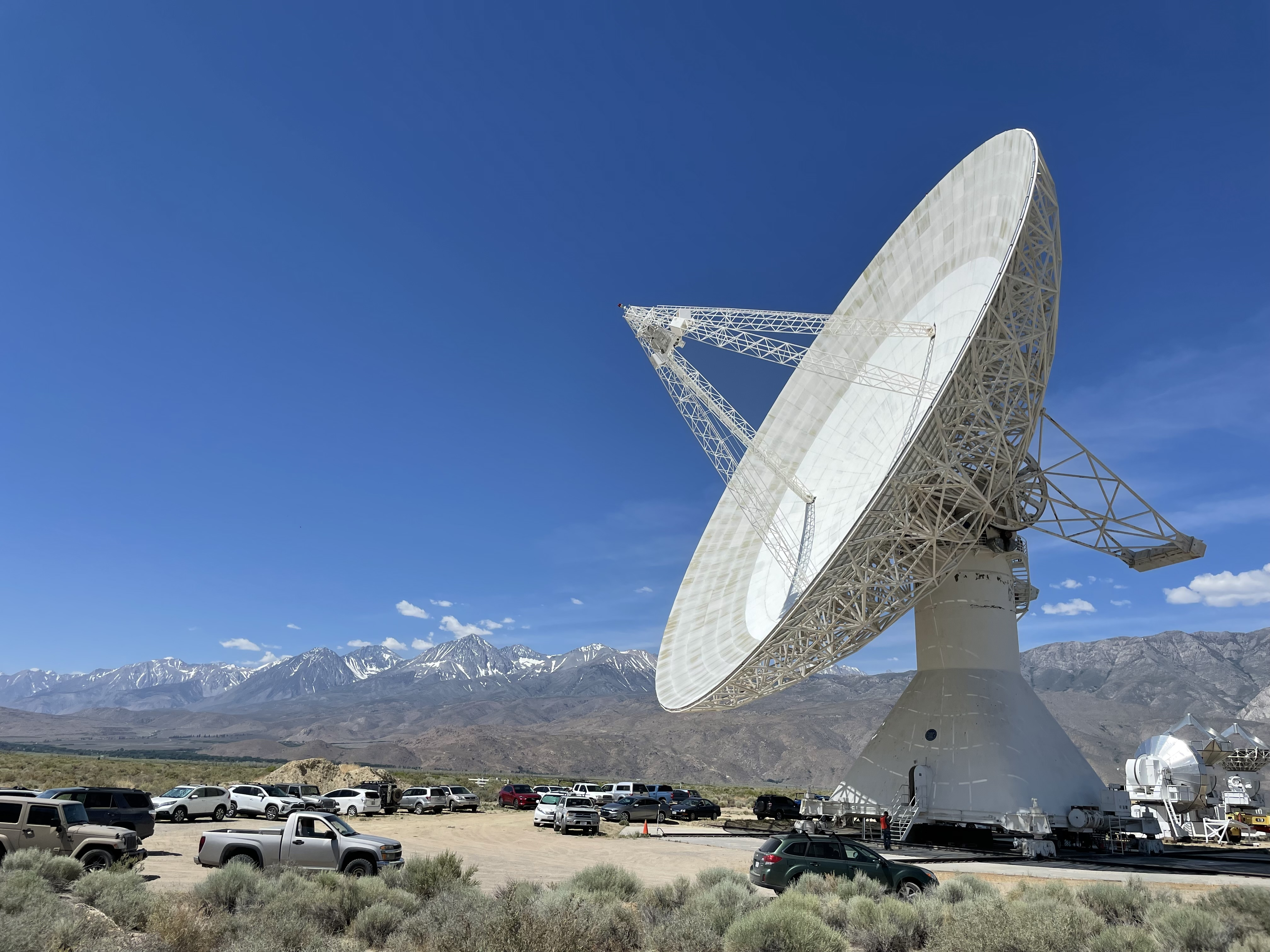
40m Antenna at Open House in 2024

=== Former instruments ===
- The Combined Array for Research in Millimeter-wave Astronomy (CARMA) was a 23-antenna interferometer located at Cedar Flat in Westgard Pass, approximately 13 km (8.1 miles) east of the main OVRO site at 2,196 m (7,205 ft). It incorporated dishes from the MMA, the former Berkeley-Illinois-Maryland Association array at Hat Creek Radio Observatory, and the Sunyaev–Zel'dovich Array. It was decommissioned in 2015.
- The C-Band All Sky Survey (C-BASS) was a 6.1 m (20 ft) telescope used to survey the sky in the C band in support of Cosmic microwave background research. A unique feature of the telescope was the use of radio-transparent foam to support the secondary mirror. The telescope began operating in 2009 and was decommissioned in 2015.
- The Huan Tran Telescope (HTT) is the primary instrument of the POLARBEAR project to measure the polarization of the cosmic microwave background radiation. It is a 3.5 m (11 ft) Gregorian telescope with bolometers cooled to less than 1 K (−458 °F). HHT was first installed for testing at the CARMA site in 2010. It was moved to Llano de Chajnantor Observatory in 2011 and began operating there in early 2012. It was developed by a consortium led by the University of California, Berkeley.
- The Owens Valley Solar Array (OVSA) was a seven-dish solar radio telescope array located at the main OVRO site until 2008. It was built by Caltech and was operated by the New Jersey Institute of Technology (NJIT) from 1997. It consisted of two 27.5 m (90 ft) antennas and five 1.8 m (5.9 ft) antennas. The OVSA antennas are being incorporated into EOVSA in a different configuration.
- The Millimeter Array (MMA) was a six-element radio telescope array located at the main OVRO site until 2005, when the dishes were moved to Cedar Flat and incorporated into CARMA. After CARMA was decommissioned, the millimeter array dishes were moved back to their original location at OVRO and have been repurposed for other projects.

=== Future instruments ===
- The DSA is a 1650 element array covering 0.7 to 2.0 GHz. Though managed by OVRO, it is located in Nevada, where a site of sufficient size (and low radio interference) is available. It is expected to begin operation in 2029.
- In 2020, construction will begin on an expansion to the Long Wavelength Array. This expansion will add 64 fiber-linked antennas at long baselines, and incorporate a new, more powerful and versatile analog and digital back end.

== In popular culture ==
In the film The Arrival (1996), Zane Zaminsky (Charlie Sheen) and Calvin (Richard Schiff) work at Owens Valley for the SETI Project and discover an alien signal.

In the film Contact (1997), the Owens Valley 40-meter telescope is mentioned as the location where Dr. Eleanor Arroway (Jodie Foster) did her thesis work.

== See also ==
- Atacama Large Millimeter Array
- List of radio telescopes
- List of astronomical observatories
