= Stephen Phillips (architect) =

Stephen Phillips, is a British-born American architect, theorist, and educator based in Los Angeles, California. Phillips is the principal of Stephen Phillips Architects (SPARCHS) and Professor of Architecture at California Polytechnic State University, San Luis Obispo.

== Education and early career ==
Born in Oxford, England, Phillips was raised in Loughton, Essex; Berkeley Heights, New Jersey; and Pasadena, California. Phillips received his B.A. from Yale University with Distinction in Architecture and his Master of Architecture from the University of Pennsylvania where he was awarded the Paul Philippe Cret Medal for best thesis. Upon earning his Master's degree and Doctor of Philosophy (Ph.D.) from Princeton University School of Architecture, Phillips was awarded residential fellowships from The J. Paul Getty Foundation and the Smithsonian American Art Museum alongside research and publication grants from the Graham Foundation for Advanced Studies in the Fine Arts and the Canadian Centre for Architecture. He was awarded an artist-in-residence at the Museumsquartier in Vienna.

Phillips received his professional training in the offices of Charles Moore (Moore Rubel Yudel), Cathy Simon (Simon Martin-Vegue Winkelstein Moris), and William Turnbull Jr. (William Turnbull and Associates /Turnbull Griffin Haesloop) prior to launching his own architecture firm.

== Professional life ==
Phillips established Stephen Phillips Architects (SPARCHS) in 1999. The design practice focuses on the construction of modern and contemporary environments. Stephen Phillips Architects is based out of Los Angeles, California and San Francisco, California.

Stephen Phillips Architects has received an American Institute of Architecture Merit Award for their work and has been published internationally in DOMUS, Der Spiegel, The Architect’s Newspaper, Dezeen, 7x7, the San Francisco Chronicle, and Sunset Magazine, among other newspapers, magazines, and journals.

In 2021, Phillips was elected to the College of Fellows of the American Institute of Architects for his "exceptional work and significant contributions to architecture and society on a national level.”

== Academic life ==
As the Founding Director of the Cal Poly Los Angeles Metropolitan Program in Architecture and Urban Design, Phillips was awarded The Studio Prize from Architect Magazine and The Creative Achievement Award from the Association of Collegiate Schools of Architecture. An article was written about Phillips's contribution to architectural education in Archinect’s “Dean’s List” in 2020.

He has taught as visiting faculty at U.C. Berkeley, UCLA, SCI-Arc, CCA, and the Art Center College of Design. Phillips is the author of L.A. [Ten]: Interviews on Los Angeles Architecture 1970s-1990s from Lars Müller Publishers, 2014; and Elastic Architecture: Frederick Kiesler and Design Research in the First Age of Robotic Culture from MIT Press, 2017.
