= Owens Valley Solar Array =

Radio telescope array

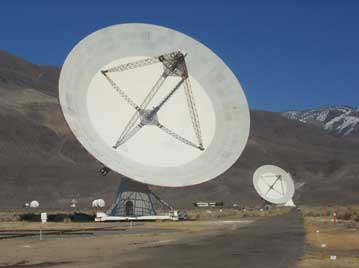
- Alternative names: OVSA
- Location(s): California, Pacific States Region
- Coordinates: 37°14′02″N 118°17′05″W
- Altitude: 1,200 m (3,900 ft)
- Website: www.ovsa.njit.edu
- Location of Owens Valley Solar Array
- Related media on Commons

The Owens Valley Solar Array (OVSA), also known as Expanded Owens Valley Solar Array (EOVSA), is an astronomical radio telescope array, located at Owens Valley Radio Observatory (OVRO), near Big Pine, California, with main interests in studying the physics of the Sun. The instruments of the observatory are designed and employed specifically for studying the activities and phenomena of our solar system's sun. Other solar dedicated instruments operated on the site include the Solar Radio Burst Locator (SRBL), the FASR Subsystem Testbed (FST), and the Korean SRBL (KSRBL). The OVSA is operated by the New Jersey Institute of Technology (NJIT), which also operates the Big Bear Solar Observatory.

== History ==
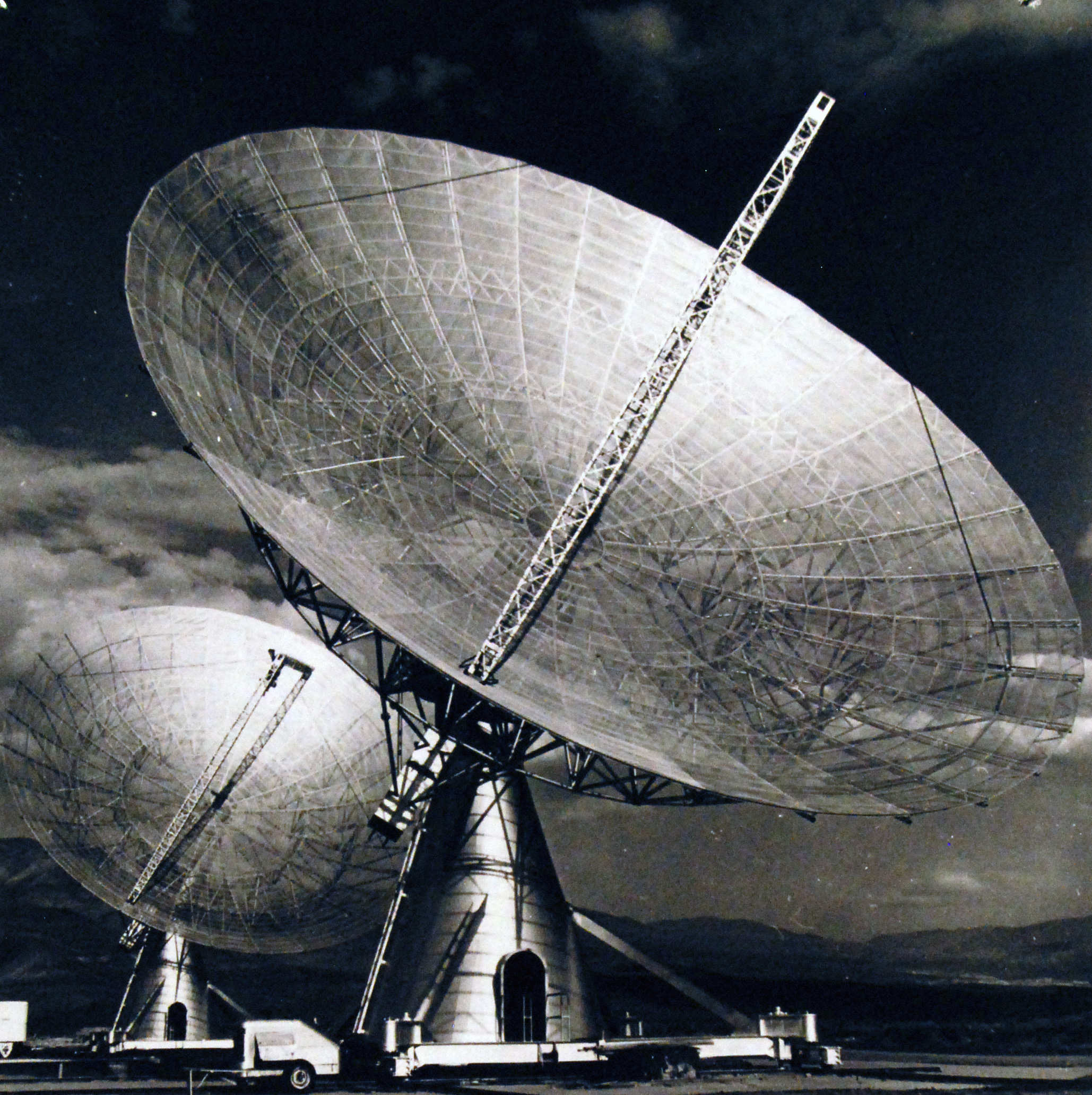
90 ft antennas after completion, 1960

The California Institute of Technology (Caltech) established the Owens Valley Radio Observatory (OVRO) in the late 1950s with a radio interferometer consisting of two 27-meter (89 ft) dishes to study radio galaxies. The radio interferometer continued to be expanded with larger and better radio telescopes. In 1979, the two dishes were retired from the radio interferometer and were repurposed to be used as an array dedicated to solar observation. The Owens Valley Solar Array was established with the two dish interferometer under the direction of professor Harold Zirin who also directed the Big Bear Solar Observatory (BBSO). Three 1.8-meter (5.9 ft) dishes were later added to the interferometer.

In 1995, when professor Zirin announced his intent to retire as the director, Caltech began to search for a successor. Eventually, the university decided to change the focus of the department and look for another organization to take over the BBSO instead. By the spring of 1996, Caltech announced that New Jersey Institute of Technology (NJIT) would run the BBSO. The agreement was signed in early 1997 to have NJIT lease the BBSO land and buildings from Caltech until 2048. The instruments and grants of the BBSO, worth about $1.6 million a year at that time, would be transferred to NJIT on 1 July 1997.

At that time Dale Gary, who was a research associate in Astrophysics at Caltech and the Principal Investigator at the Owens Valley Solar Array lab, moved to NJIT to become a faculty member. The management of the Owens Valley Solar Array was then transferred to NJIT in 1997. In 2004, two more 1.8-meter (5.9 ft) dishes were added, forming a 7-antenna interferometer.

=== Array expansion ===
Layout of Expanded Owens Valley Solar Array (EOVSA) with 15 antennas. Smaller orange dots are thirteen 2.1-m antennas. Blue dots are two 27-m antennas. Yellow rectangle is a control building.

In 2010, NJIT proposed to expand the Owens Valley Solar Array to add 8 additional 2.1-meter (6.9 ft) and upgrade the older antennas. This would bring the array to have the total of 15 antennas with 13 smaller antennas in a three-arm spiral configuration that span across the 900-meter (3,000 ft) radius (see layout on the right). This would required all existing smaller antennas to be relocated and thirteen new antenna pads to installed. A new control building would be erected and cable trenching would be done along the access roads. The environmental assessment was conducted and the alternative was chosen to minimize the impacts.

In October 2010, the National Science Foundation awarded a $5 million grant to start working on the expansion. The project was to also replace existing control systems, wiring, and signal processing systems to newer technologies. The project would result in key diagnostic observations of the magnetic and thermal structure of the solar atmosphere, the release of magnetic energy in the corona, and the space weather consequences of solar activity.

== Instruments ==
=== Owens Valley Solar Array (OVSA) ===
The array employs its seven antennas to perform radio interferometry at up to 86 radio frequencies ranging from 1 to 18 gigahertz (microwave range). The combination of spatial and spectral resolution is called microwave imaging spectroscopy, which provides rich diagnostic information about the Sun. It is sensitive to both thermal radiation from the chromosphere and corona of the Sun, and to non-thermal radiation from high-energy electrons accelerated in solar flares.

The array has also been used in the discovery and study of the effects of solar radio bursts on wireless communication systems, including cell phones and the Global Positioning System (GPS). Such effects are aspects of Space weather.

Seven-antenna layout

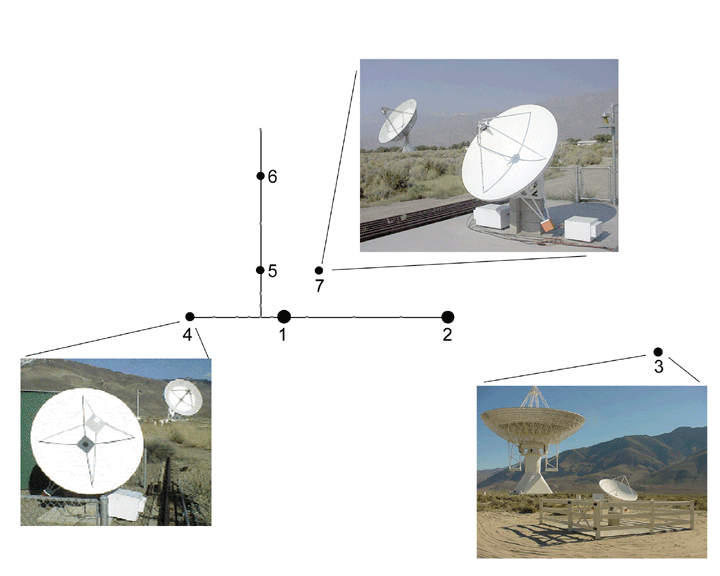
The OVSA layout with 7 antennas

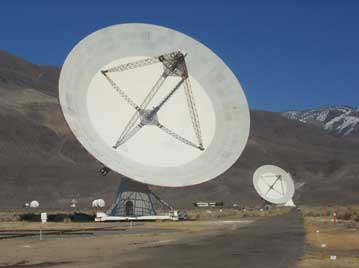
A 27-m antenna

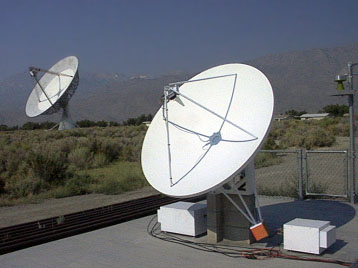
A 1.8-m antenna

=== Solar Radio Burst Locator (SRBL) prototype ===
In the 1990s, the United States Air Force was looking for a cost-effective replacement of its aging Radio Solar Telescope Network (RSTN) which was operated in fixed frequencies. Caltech team proposed the Solar Radio Burst Locator (SRBL) which would use the technique of frequency agility that was studied at the OVSA. Under a contract with the United States Air Force, prototypes were developed at the Owens Valley Radio Observatory. Initially, the plan was to deploy SRBL to co-locate with RSTN sites within 1 to 2 years to supplement the optical observations of the Solar Observing Optical Network.

Research-grade prototypes were developed with the hardware and software that were based on the OVSA system. The field testing started in 1994 with one antenna in Hawaii and the other antenna located near the OVSA site, about 10 meters (33 ft) away from one of its antennas.

SRBL was a spectrometer using an automated 1.8-meter (5.9 ft) parabolic dish antenna with spiral antenna receiving element that was capable of observing 120 frequencies from 610 MHz to 18 GHz at 4.8 second interval. Additionally, 245 and 410 MHz frequencies can be observed from a dual Yagi antenna attached to the feed. The system observed the full solar disk was able to locate microwave burst positions by a single dish without using interferometry or mechanical scanning.

Eventually, Raytheon Company was under a contract to manufacture the production quality instruments. The SRBL prototype antenna was left at the Owens Valley Radio Observatory and had been in operation since 1998. In 2005, the Korean government awarded a grant to evaluate the SRBL system to continue the improvements of the system to create the Korean-SRBL.

== See also ==
- Owens Valley-related topics
- List of solar telescopes
