= John Carlstrom =

American astrophysicist

John E. Carlstrom (born 1957) is an American astrophysicist, and Professor, Departments of Astronomy and Astrophysics, and Physics, at the University of Chicago.

He graduated from Vassar College with an A.B. in 1981, and from the University of California, Berkeley with a Ph.D. in 1988.

Carlstrom specializes in measurements of the Cosmic Microwave Background, and has led several experiments, including the Degree Angular Scale Interferometer, the Sunyaev-Zel'dovich Array, and the South Pole Telescope.

He is also known for manufacturing the Gunn oscillators used at several millimeter and submillimeter observatories, such as the BIMA array, the Caltech Submillimeter Observatory and the James Clerk Maxwell Telescope. These oscillators produced the local oscillator signal for the observatorys' heterodyne receivers.

== Awards ==
- 1998 MacArthur Fellows Program
- 2004 Magellanic Gold Medal
- 2006 Beatrice M. Tinsley Prize
- 2015 Gruber Prize in Cosmology
- 2020 Elected a Legacy Fellow of the American Astronomical Society
