= Leo Blitz =

American astronomer (1946–2022)

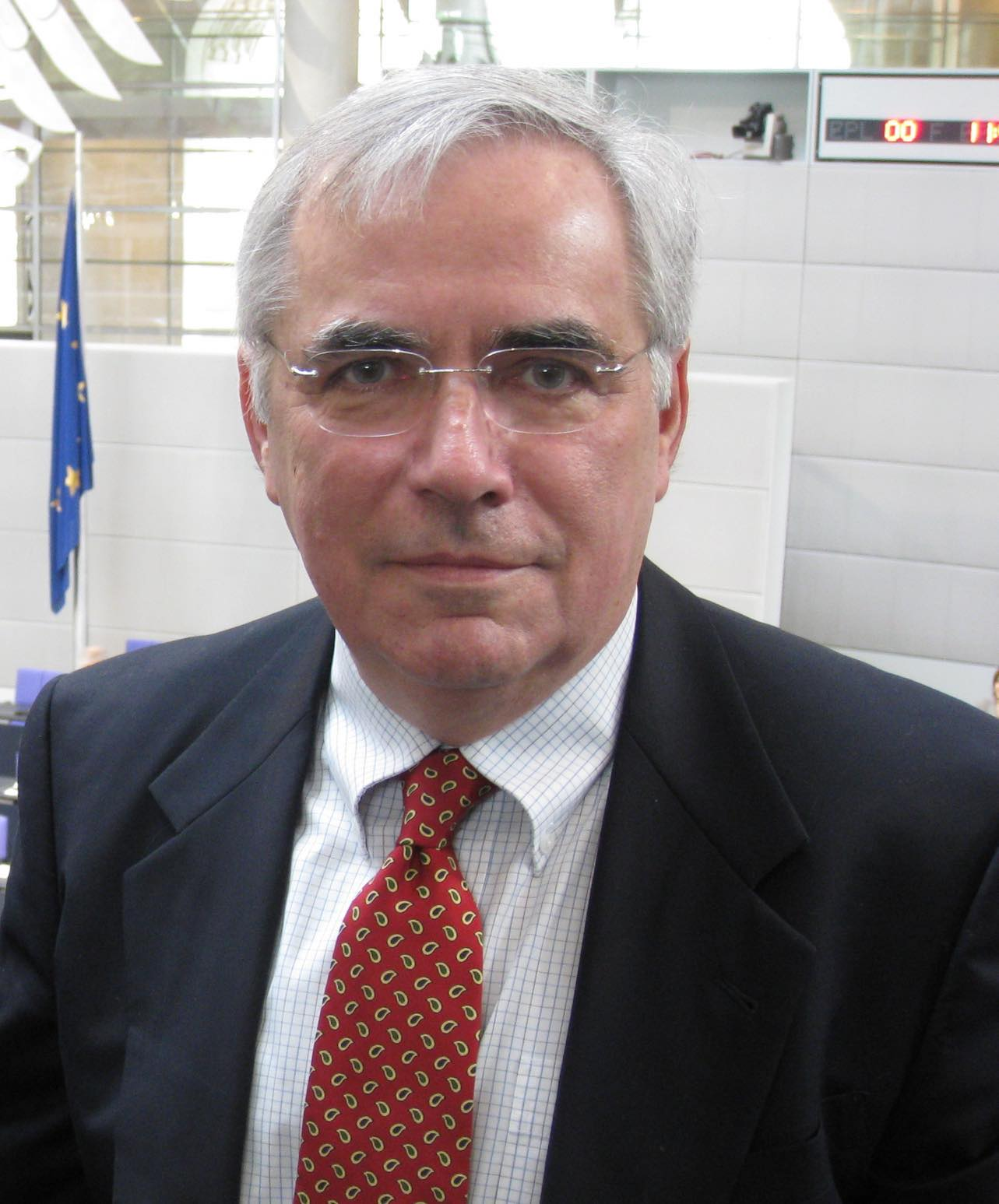
- Born: March 21, 1946; Munich, Germany
- Died: December 20, 2022 (aged 76); Sonora, California, United States
- Education: Cornell University; Columbia University; University of Maryland; University of California, Berkeley
- Spouse: Lidewij de Vries
- Children: 2
- Scientific career
- Fields: Galactic structure and evolution Molecular clouds Star formation Interstellar medium
- Thesis: A Study of the Molecular Complexes Accompanying MON OB1 MON OB2 and CMA OB1 (1979)
- Doctoral advisor: Patrick Thaddeus
- Doctoral students: Nia Imara

Leo Blitz (March 21, 1946 – December 20, 2022) was an American astronomer, researcher, and a professor of astronomy at the University of California, Berkeley (UC Berkeley).

== Early life ==
Blitz was born in Munich on March 21, 1946, although his birth certificate was later altered (to October 21, 1946) because, in order for his family to emigrate to the US, he needed to be older and a Polish citizen.

His mother Maria, who grew up in the Warsaw Ghetto, survived Auschwitz and the Stutthof concentration camp, and was one of only 30 survivors of the Palmnicken Massacre. She met and married Leo's father Abraham Blitz in Krakow in 1945. Abraham Blitz, who was born in Poland but grew up in Vienna, was in Krakow serving in the occupying Soviet Army.

== Career ==
Completing his bachelor's from Cornell University in engineering physics in 1967, Blitz worked for six years as a nuclear engineer on power plant safety. Between 1973 and 1976, he did his master's from Columbia University wherein he worked using a millimeter-wave telescope to map carbon monoxide (CO) around Rosette Nebula to find a giant molecular cloud (GMC). He later completed his postdoctorate also from Columbia University in 1979 with Patrick Thaddeus as his doctoral advisor. Between 1978 and 1981 he was a postdoctoral fellow at the Radio Astronomy Laboratory at UC Berkeley.

Starting in 1981, Blitz was appointed as a professor in the University of Maryland College Park where he also researched on the star formation of GMCs. From 1988 to 1996, he served as the director for millimeter-wave astronomy at UMB. Following which in 1996, he moved to the UC Berkeley where he became a director of the Radio Astronomy Laboratory and worked with the Berkeley-Illinois-Maryland Association (BIMA) telescope array. As a member of BIMA, a survey was conducted by Blitz called "Survey of Normal Galaxies" to find out about young GMCs and rate of its star formation that differed from galaxy to galaxy. Between 1994 and 1997, he also was a member of the National Research Council (NRC) Committee on Astronomy and Astrophysics.

Later from 2004, Blitz was working with Combined Array for Research in Millimeter-wave Astronomy's (CARMA) telescopes which was developed by combining three different telescope designs from two university radio observatories and BIMA. This work led Blitz to take up another survey project, Atlas 3d survey, to observe 30 galaxies for detecting CO using CARMA. He also was a professor of astronomy at the UC Berkeley and later became its emeritus professor.

As a member of International Astronomical Union (IAU), Blitz served as the president of Commission 33 Structure & Dynamics of the Galactic System and IAU's different divisions. He also served as the councillor of American Astronomical Society (AAS) from 1995 to 1998 and also in its Warner/Pierce Prize Committee from 2002 to 2003.

In 2006, Martin D. Weinberg, professor of astronomy at the University of Massachusetts Amherst, worked with Blitz to create a computer model to observe an obscure warp of the Magellanic Clouds in the Milky Way Galaxy. On the phenomenon, Blitz remarked that "it looks like the Milky Way is flapping in the breeze".

Between 2006 and 2008, Blitz was the director of the Allen Telescopic Array (ATA). On October 16, 2007, the first forty-two radio dishes of the ATA were launched to collect scientific data on far distances in the universe. ATA was made by a joint collaboration between UC Berkeley, of whom Blitz was one of its representatives, and the SETI Institute.

In 2013, Blitz recognized the potential of a technique, known as Atacama Large Millimeter/submillimeter Array (ALMA), to measure large masses of black holes at farther distances. An year later, Blitz, among one of the astronomers, found out five stars (Cepheid variable) at a distance of 75,000 light-years away from Earth. He remarked that it was a challenging task as the thick dust blocks the light from any distant star.

As a professor, a total of 15 students including Nia Imara completed their postdoctorate under Blitz at the UC Berkeley.

== Personal life ==
Blitz was involved in various recreational activities, including playing squash, tennis, bicycling, fishing, and running. He also listened to opera, music, and enjoyed having good food especially gourmet chocolate.

Suffering from Parkinson's disease for a long time, Blitz died in his home in his family's presence on December 20, 2022, in Sonora, California. At the time, he was living with his wife, Lidewij de Vries, and his two sons and grandsons. He also has a sibling, Andrew.

== Awards and honours ==
- Alfred P. Sloan Foundation Fellowship, 1984–1988, by the University of Maryland, Baltimore in Physics.
