= Combined Array for Research in Millimeter-wave Astronomy =

Astronomical instrument

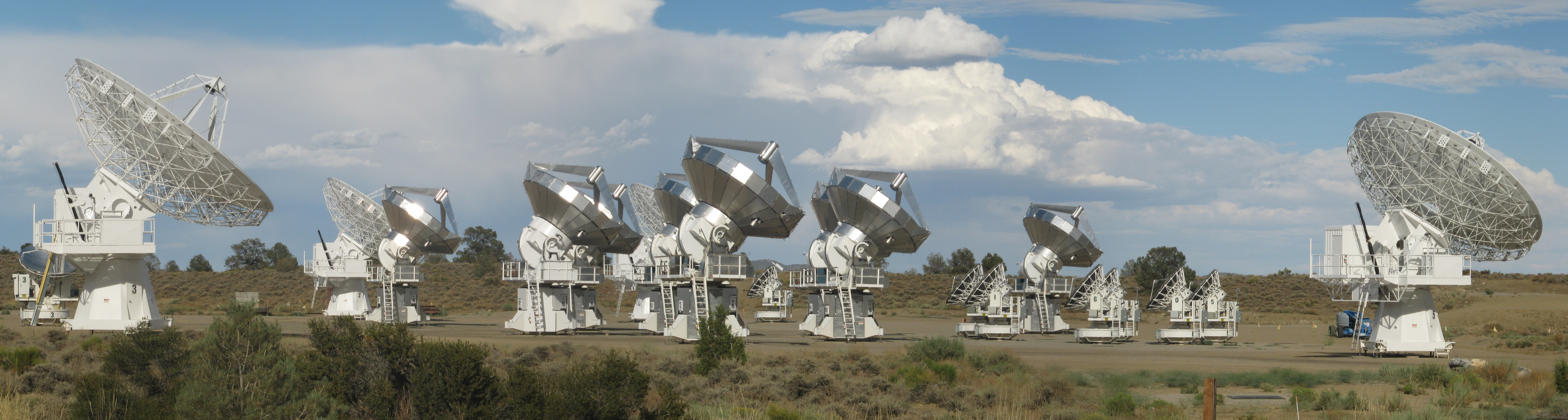
- Location(s): California, Pacific States Region
- Coordinates: 37°16′49″N 118°08′31″W
- Altitude: 2,196 m (7,205 ft)
- Website: www.mmarray.org
- Location of Combined Array for Research in Millimeter-wave Astronomy
- Related media on Commons

The Combined Array for Research in Millimeter-wave Astronomy (CARMA) was an astronomical instrument comprising 23 radio telescopes, dedicated in 2006. These telescopes formed an astronomical interferometer where all the signals are combined in a purpose-built computer (a correlator) to produce high-resolution astronomical images. The telescopes ceased operation in April 2015 and were relocated to the Owens Valley Radio Observatory for storage.

The Atacama Large Millimeter Array in Chile has succeeded CARMA as the most powerful millimeter wave interferometer in the world.

== Location ==
According to the CARMA observatory catalog, the median height of all telescope pads was at an elevation of 2,196.223 meters (7,205.456 ft). The observatory was located in the Inyo Mountains to the east of the Owens Valley Radio Observatory, at a site called Cedar Flat (after relocating the Cedar Flat Group Camps to the west of Hwy-168), accessed through Westgard Pass. The high elevation site was chosen to minimize millimeter wave absorption and phase decoherence by atmospheric water vapor.

== Features ==
This array was unique for being a heterogeneous collection of radio telescopes of varying sizes and design. There were three types of telescopes, all Cassegrain reflector antennas with parabolic primary mirrors and hyperbolic secondary mirrors:

- Six telescopes each 10.4 meters (34 ft) in diameter. These were part of the Millimeter Array at the OVRO site operated by Caltech. They were moved to Cedar Flat in the Spring of 2005.
- Nine telescopes each 6.1 m (20 ft) in diameter. These were formerly located at the Hat Creek Radio Observatory and operated by the Berkeley-Illinois-Maryland-Association (BIMA) consortium. These were moved from HCRO in the spring of 2005 to Cedar Flat.
- Eight telescopes each 3.5 m (11 ft) in diameter. These were built as an instrument for cosmology and are also known as the Sunyaev-Zel'dovich Array (SZA), a project led by John Carlstrom at the University of Chicago. The SZA spent three years on the valley floor at the Owens Valley Radio Observatory observing the cosmic microwave background (CMB) and galaxy clusters. In the summer of 2008 it was moved up to Cedar Flat.

== Deployment ==
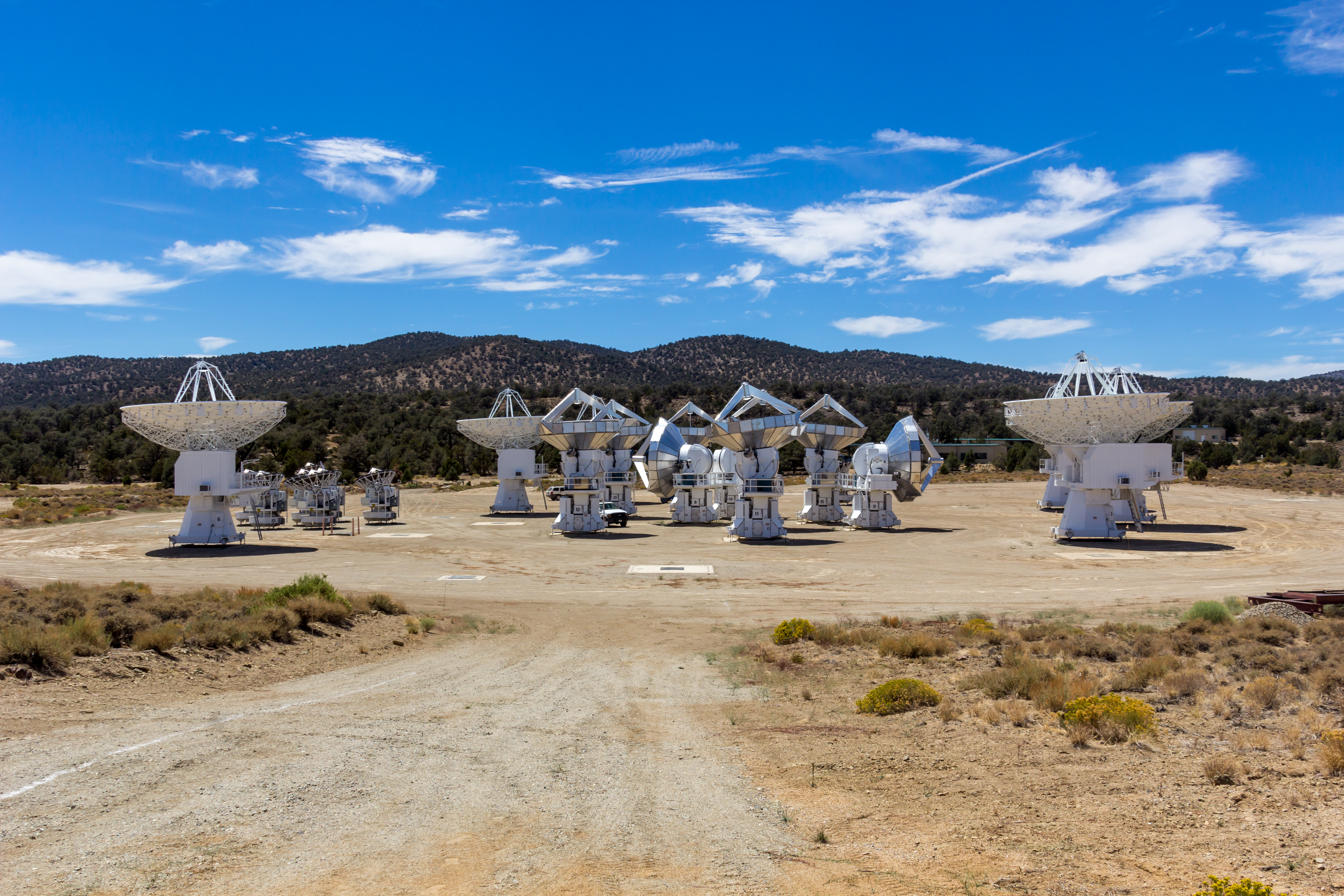
CARMA in 2012

According to Leo Blitz, when in 1996 he took over directorship of Berkeley's Radio Astronomy Laboratory, the giant millimeter-wave astronomy project now in Atacama (ALMA) was already in prospect, although far from completion. Over the next decade-plus, RAL moved the millimeter-wave telescopes that had been at their Hat Creek site -- six from OVRO and nine from BIMA -- to the higher-altitude at Cedar Flat, and coordinated them in what became known as CARMA. (They were replaced at Hat Creek by the beginnings of the Allen Telescope Array.)

As of November 2006, the first fifteen telescopes were working together to gather scientific data. Pioneering work on compensating for the image distortion resulting from turbulent water vapor distributions in the troposphere started in the fall of 2008.

The most extended configurations of the array, up to 2 kilometers (1.2 mi), were required for viewing the finest details in astronomical images. Over these distances the variation in the time of arrival of signals at the different telescopes as they pass through different amounts of water vapor severely limits the quality of images.

By siting an SZA antenna near each of the CARMA antennas and observing a compact astronomical radio source near the source under study, the properties of the atmosphere could be measured on time scales as short as a couple of seconds. This information could be used in the data reduction process to remove a significant fraction of the degradation caused by the atmospheric scintillation.

Observations using the SZA (operating at 30 GHz) to make the atmospheric measurements started in November 2008. The SZA has also participated directly in the science operations of CARMA during experiments where all three types of telescopes were attached to the same correlator.

Observations were primarily in the 3 mm range (80–115 GHz) and the 1 mm range (210–270 GHz). These frequencies are useful for detecting many molecular gases, including the second most abundant molecule in the universe, carbon monoxide (CO).

Observing CO is an indirect indicator of the presence of molecular hydrogen gas (the most abundant molecule in the universe) which is difficult to detect directly. Cold dust is also detectable in this wavelength range and can be used to study planet-forming disks around stars, for example. In 2009, the OVRO 10.4 m antennas were instrumented with 27–35 GHz receivers and made observations in the centimeter band in concert with the SZA antennas.

The telescopes ceased operation in 2015 and were relocated to the Owens Valley Radio Observatory for storage.

== VLBI ==
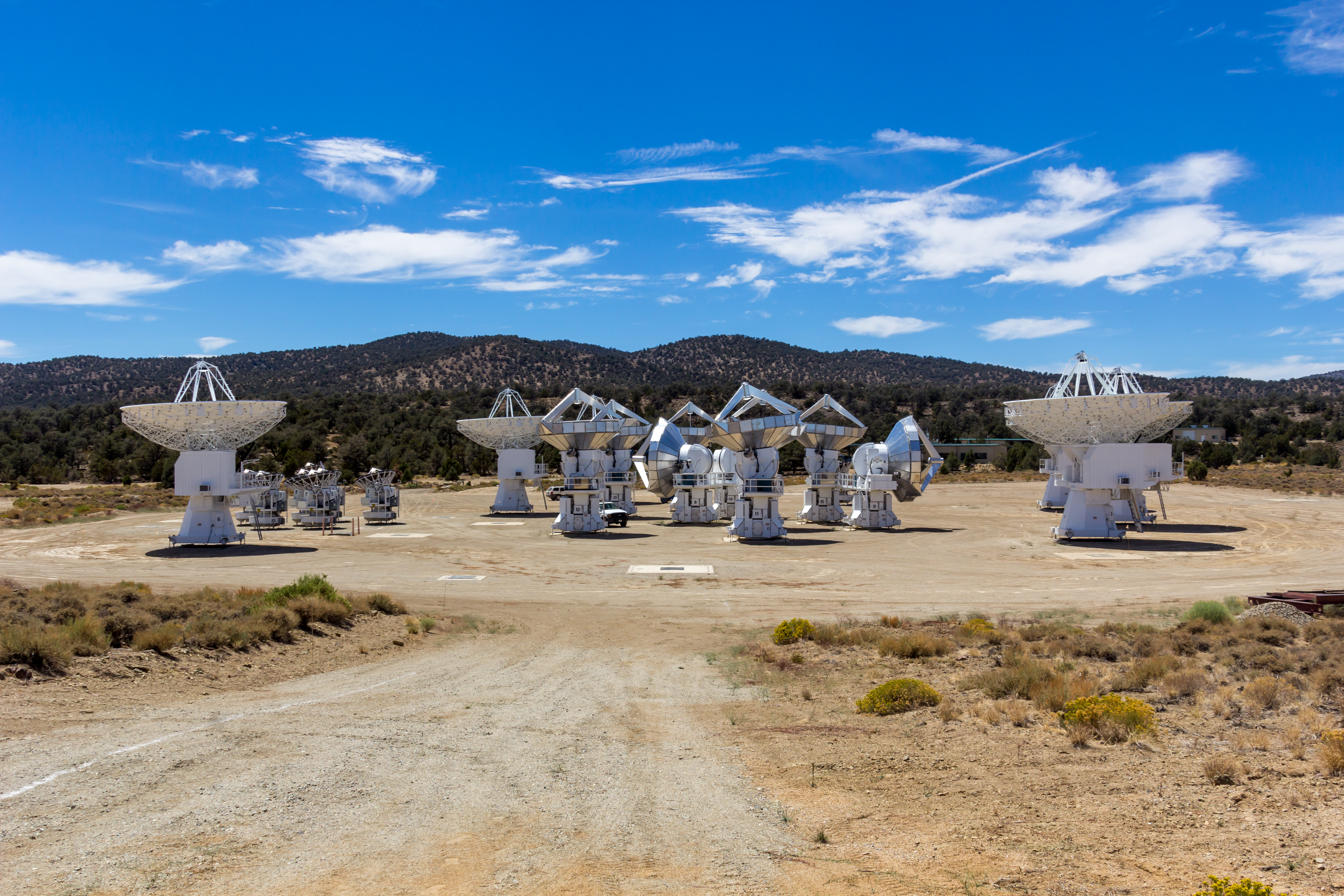
CARMA telescopes in 2012

CARMA was an array element in the early proof-of-concept observations by the Event Horizon Telescope project, and in 2007 participated in observations which showed that event-horizon-scale structures could be seen in the Milky Way's supermassive black hole, Sgr A*.

== Universities involved ==
CARMA was a consortium composed of three primary groups.

California Institute of Technology, Berkeley-Illinois-Maryland Association (BIMA), University of Chicago

- California Institute of Technology
- University of California, Berkeley, Radio Astronomy Laboratory
- University of Chicago
- University of Illinois at Urbana-Champaign, Laboratory for Astronomical Imaging
- University of Maryland, College Park, Laboratory for Millimeter-wave Astronomy

== See also ==
- Atacama Large Millimeter Array
- Interferometry
- Owens Valley Radio Observatory
- Radio astronomy
- Sunyaev–Zeldovich effect
