= Charles Stuart Cushing =

American attorney

- Born: December 28, 1867; San Francisco, California
- Died: January 7, 1946 (aged 78)
- Spouse: Anne Sessions
- Parents: John Morland Cushing (father); Anne M. Kennedy (mother)
- Relatives: Oscar K. Cushing (brother)

Charles Stuart Cushing (December 28, 1867 – January 7, 1946) was an American attorney and amateur astronomer.

== Biography ==
Cushing was born on December 28, 1867, in San Francisco, California, one of five children of John Morland Cushing and Anne Mary Kennedy. His father was a pioneer who had traveled to California from New York in 1849 for the gold rush. As a boy, he lived on a ranch with his father and uncle in San Luis Obispo county. Cushing was educated in public schools of California, including the North Cosmopolitan Grammar School in San Francisco. The principal of the latter school was Kate Kennedy, sister of Cushing's mother. Some time later the family moved to Oakland, California, where Cushing graduated from Oakland High School in December, 1884.

Hired as a clearinghouse clerk, Cushing worked at the First National Bank of San Francisco immediately after graduation. But he decided to pursue a legal career and studied for the Bar at a law office in San Francisco. On January 13, 1891, Cushing was licensed with the California Bar and entered the law firm of Mullany and Grant. Two years later, he became an associate and the law office was renamed Mullany, Grant, and Cushing. His brother Oscar K. Cushing joined this firm in 1896. The association lasted until Michael Mullany died in 1903. On August 10, 1903, Cushing was married to Anne Sessions. The Cushing brothers formed their own law firm, Cushing and Cushing, in 1908. They would continue in practice together for a combined period of fifty years. In 1918–1919, Cushing was president of the California Bar Association. During 1919–1924, he was a member of the general council for the American Bar Association.

During High School, Cushing became interested in astronomy under the influence of his teacher Charles Burckhalter, who was director of the Chabot Observatory. Cushing joined a group that traveled to Ukiah in northern California to observe the total solar eclipse of January 1, 1889. This event led to the founding of the Astronomical Society of the Pacific (ASP), and Cushing was voted into membership in July, 1889. He served on the Board of Directors of ASP for 45 years, as chairman of the Finance Committee, and was elected president in 1907 and 1921. In 1922, he was named a Fellow of the Royal Astronomical Society.

Cushing had interests in agriculture and history. He was a member of the California Historical Society and served four terms as president of the Society of California Pioneers. Cushing was a member of the Bohemian Club.
