= SETIcon =

Public conventions on the search for extraterrestrial intelligence

- Promotional poster designed by Paul Duffield
- Status: Defunct
- Genre: Astronomy; Astrobiology; Science Fiction
- Venue: Hyatt Regency
- Locations: Santa Clara, CA
- Country: USA
- Inaugurated: 2010
- Attendance: About 600 in 2012
- Organizer: SETI Institute
- Website: seticon.com

SETIcon was a public convention organized by the SETI Institute and held twice in Santa Clara, California. It was an interdisciplinary conference, with talks focusing on a wide range of issues related to the search for extraterrestrial intelligence (SETI). The programs included panels with prominent scientists from NASA and SETI; talks by science fiction writers, artists, and actors; and panels to explore controversial issues and compare perspectives. The sessions were non-technical and meant to increase awareness, interest, and funding for the SETI Institute. The convention attracted professional scientists, educators, space enthusiasts, and science fiction fans. Astronomical tattoos were not uncommon among attendees.

The first SETIcon took place on 13–15 August 2010 and drew about 1,000 people. It commemorated the 25th anniversary of the SETI Institute, the 50th anniversary of SETI, and the 80th birthday of Frank Drake, the radio astronomer who started Project Ozma and pioneered the SETI program. Speakers included scientists Frank Drake, Alex Filippenko, Seth Shostak, Andrew Fraknoi, David Morrison and Jill Tarter; author Robert J. Sawyer; professional skeptic Phil Plait; graphic artist Paul Duffield; actor Tim Russ; and musician Mickey Hart. During one of the panels, Seth Shostak said he expected proof of extraterrestrial life to be found within 25 years. "Young people in the audience, I think there's a really good chance you're going to see this happen."

SETIcon II was held on 22–24 June 2012 and drew about 600 people and 60 speakers, including Bill Nye. Recent findings from NASA's Kepler mission fueled much of the discussion—between 2009 and 2012 the experiment detected about 2,300 new exoplanets, making the discovery of intelligent extraterrestrial life increasingly plausible. Among the returning speakers was Alex Filippenko, who during a panel called "Did the Big Bang Require a Divine Spark?" argued against the necessity of God as the first cause of the Big Bang. He and Seth Shostak said that the laws of physics, specifically quantum fluctuations, can enable the universe to come into being spontaneously. The "divine spark", Filippenko said, is whatever created the laws of physics; since science can't tell us what caused the divine spark, it is best to save a step and leave it at the laws of physics. Shostak added: "So, it could be that this universe is merely the science fair project of a kid in another universe. I don't know how that affects your theological leanings, but it is something to consider."

== See also ==
- Allen Telescope Array – Radio telescope array in California
- Astrobiology – Science concerned with life in the universe
- Drake Equation – Estimate of extraterrestrial civilizations
- setiQuest – Inactive interstellar scientific project
