= Radio Astronomy Laboratory =

Research unit at the University of California

The Radio Astronomy Lab (RAL) is an Organized Research Unit (ORU) within the Astronomy Department at the University of California, Berkeley. It was founded by faculty member Harold Weaver in 1958. Until 2012, RAL maintained a radio astronomy observatory at Hat Creek, near Mt. Lassen. It continues to support on-campus laboratory facilities in Campbell Hall. From 1998 to 2012, the RAL collaborated with the SETI Institute of Mountain View California to design, build and operate the Allen Telescope Array (ATA).

RAL has been central to the creation of several radio observatories, including:

- Hat Creek Radio Observatory (HCRO),
- the Allen Telescope Array (ATA),
- the Berkeley-Illinois-Maryland Association (BIMA) array,
- the Combined Array for Research in Millimeter-wave Astronomy (CARMA) array,
- the Precision Array for Probing the Epoch of Reionization (PAPER) array

== Research interests ==
- Millimeter-wavelength interferometry
- Very long baseline interferometry
- Low-frequency radio interferometry targeting the Epoch of Reionization
- Pulsars and other radio transients
- Digital signal processing (DSP) instrumentation

== Directors ==
- Carl Heiles (director, 2010–current)
- Donald Backer (director, 2008–2010), deceased
- Leo Blitz (director, 1996–2008)
- William "Jack" Welch (director, 1972–1996), decreased
- Harold F. Weaver (director, 1958–1972), deceased

== Current faculty ==
Current faculty include:

- Carl Heiles
- Leo Blitz
- Imke de Pater
- Geoff Bower
- Aaron Parsons

== Senior scientific staff ==
- Dick Plambeck
- Melvyn Wright

== See also ==
- List of astronomical societies
