= NGC 2776 =

Galaxy in the constellation of Lynx

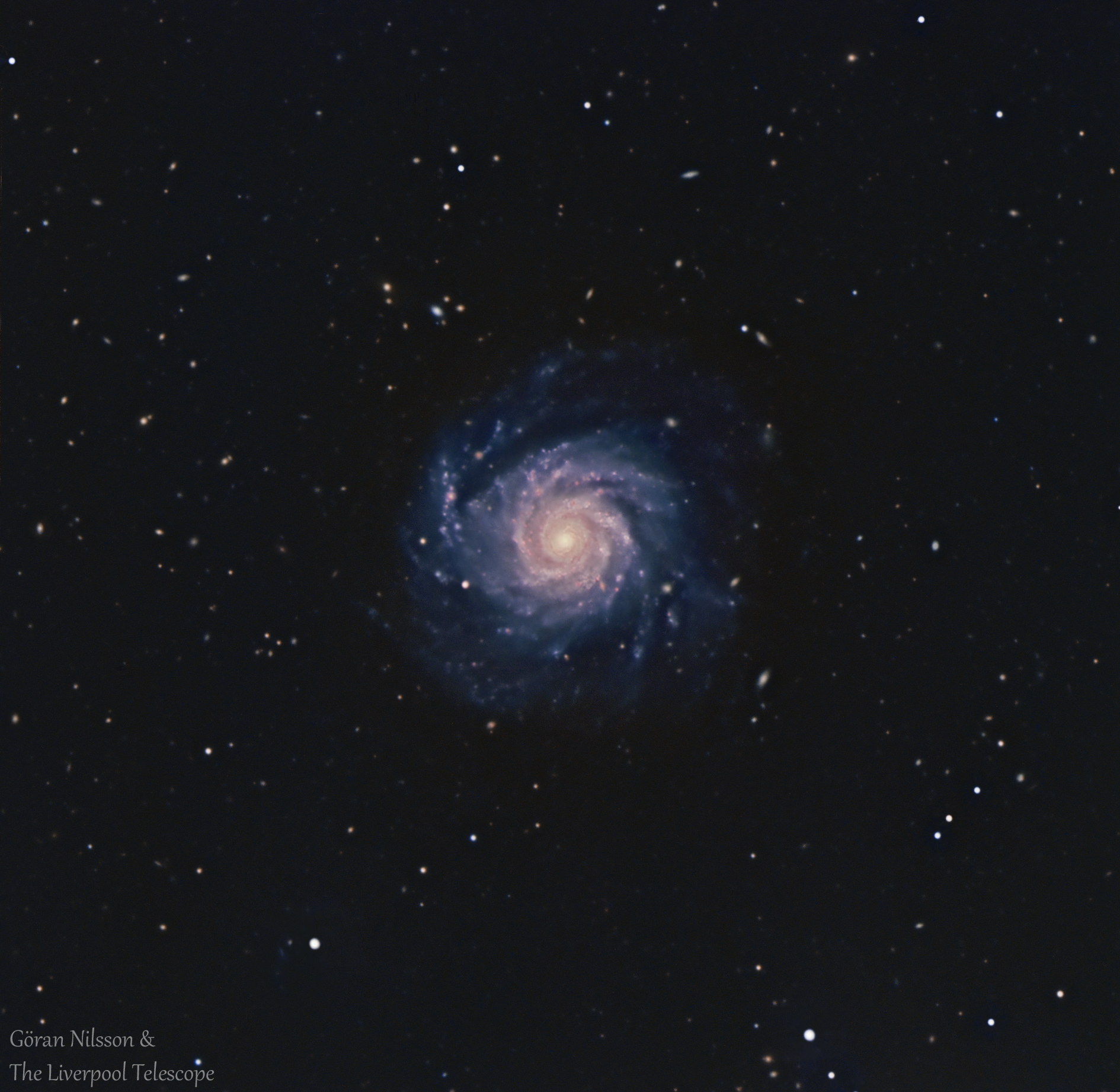
- Liverpool Telescope image of NGC 2776

Observation data (J2000 epoch)
- Constellation: Lynx
- Right ascension: 09^{h} 12^{m} 14.52^{s}
- Declination: +44° 57′ 17.48″
- Redshift: 0.008759
- Heliocentric radial velocity: 2,626 km/s
- Distance: 136 Mly
- Apparent magnitude (V): 11.4

Characteristics
- Type: SAB(rs)c
- Size: ~84,600 ly (25.95 kpc) (estimated)

Other designations
- 2MIG 1236, ECO 03209, PGC 25946, IRAS 09089+4509, KUG 0908+451, MCG +08-17-056, NSA 157091, SIG 0690, UGC 4838, KIG 0314

NGC 2776 is an intermediate spiral galaxy located in the constellation of Lynx. The redshift of the galaxy is (z) 0.0087 and it was discovered in March 1828 by the British astronomer named John Herschel, who described it as a bright object, round with a bright middle.

== Description ==
NGC 2776 is classified as an isolated spiral galaxy of type SAB(rs)c or an early type Sc that is described as face-on. The galaxy shows the presence of spiral arms considered as fragmented, with star formation activity as seen in optical imaging. These arms appear to emerge from a smooth inner disk on the outer edge with high surface brightness. One of the arms appear to be blue; this also corresponds to an approximate stellar age of less than 10^{7} years. The central nucleus of the galaxy has a bright appearance.

There is also a central region present in the galaxy with a reddened appearance and described as elongated. An inner ring feature is shown based on JHK imaging. A weak bar feature is suggested, although a study published in June 1997 suggested it lacks a bar. Regions of H II have also been detected inside the galaxy.

The supermassive black hole lying inside the center of the galaxy is estimated to be 6.9 M_{☉}, based on a study of low-luminosity galaxies published in 2007.

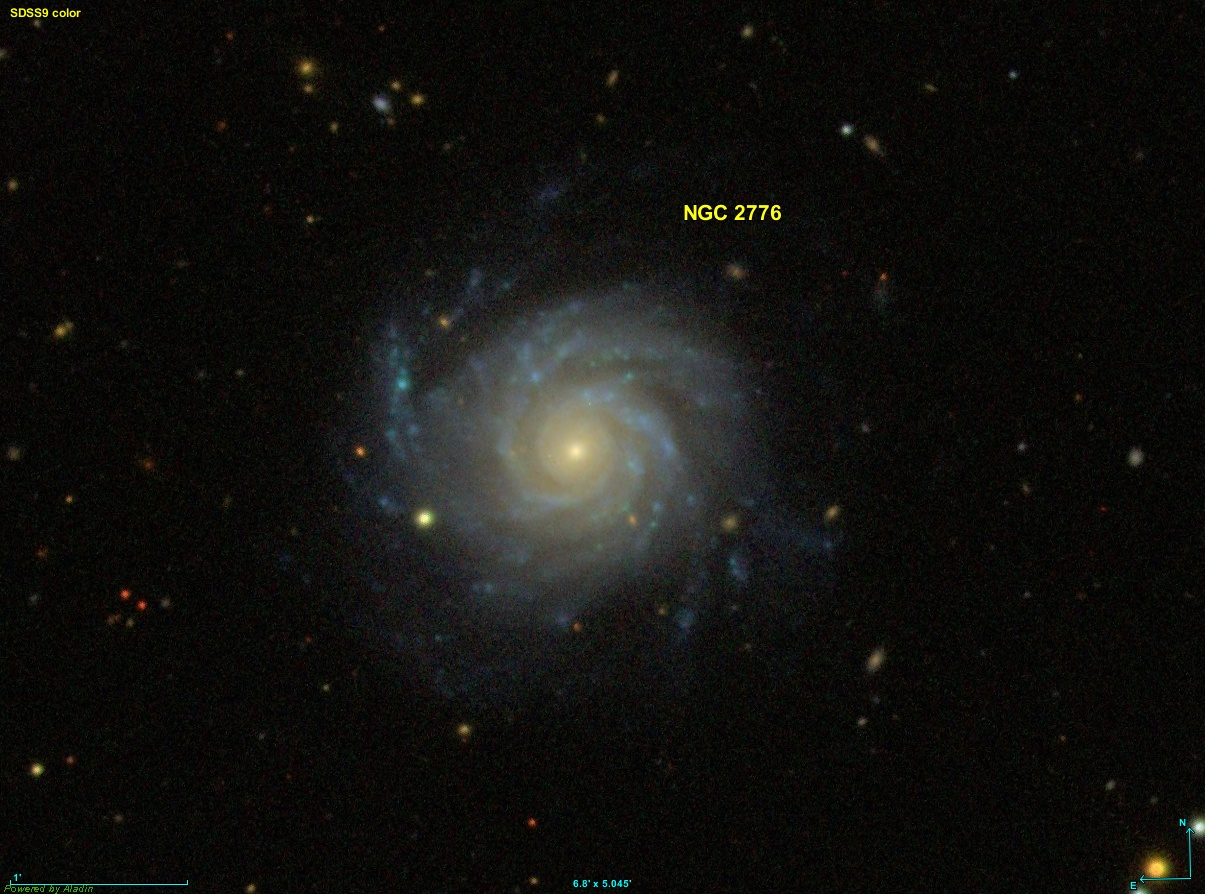
SDSS image of NGC 2776.
