= Harold Francis Weaver =

American astronomer (1917–2017)

- Born: September 25, 1917; San Jose, California
- Died: April 26, 2017 (aged 99); Kensington, California
- Education: Ph.D. UC Berkeley 1942
- Spouse: Cecile Trumpler
- Scientific career
- Fields: Radio astronomy
- Thesis: The Absorption of Light and Space Distribution of Stars in the Aquila Region of the Milky way (1942)
- Academic advisors: Robert Julius Trumpler
- Notable students: Carl Sagan

Harold Francis Weaver (September 25, 1917 – April 26, 2017) was a pioneering American radio astronomer and educator. He was professor emeritus of astronomy at the University of California, Berkeley, where he founded and directed its Radio Astronomy Laboratory. With his colleagues, he was the first to discover an interstellar maser. He served as president of the Astronomical Society of the Pacific from 1971 until 1973.

== Biography ==
He was born in San Jose, California, the only child of Charles Edward Weaver and Signe née Wymar. He grew up during the Great Depression and for a time the family had economic difficulties, resorting to living above a spaghetti factory. As a youth, he first gained an interest in building model airplanes and then in astronomy and building his own telescopes. For a time he was interested in classical literature and considered that as a field of study. After graduating from San Jose High, he chose to pursue his interest in astronomy and matriculated to the University of California, Berkley.

While an undergraduate, he met his future wife, Cecile Trumpler, the daughter of astronomer Robert Julius Trumpler. They married in 1939 and would have three children: Margot, Paul, and Kirk. Weaver completed his B.S. degree in 1940, then attended graduate school at the same institution. During the summer of 1940, Weaver was sent to the Mt. Wilson observatory to assist Walter Baade. He repeated this in the summers of 1941 and 1942. Weaver completed his doctorate in 1942 with a thesis titled, The Absorption of Light and Space Distribution of Stars in the Aquila Region of the Milky way. His doctoral advisor was his wife's father, Robert Trumpler.

Following his graduation, Weaver spent a year as a postdoctoral fellow at Yerkes Observatory for the National Research Council during 1942–43. He was also at the McDonald Observatory during this period. With the U.S. having entered World War II, Weaver was conscripted for war work during 1944–45. He was engaged as a technical aide at the optics division of the National Defense Research Committee. Later, he worked in the Manhattan Project for the division performing isotope separation at the Berkeley Radiation Lab.

=== Career ===
Following the war, he was invited to join the staff at Lick Observatory by C. D. Shane. From there he was loaned to Berkeley to perform teaching for a period of time. In 1947, he was a member of a U.S. eclipse expedition to Brazil. He joined the UC Berkeley astronomy faculty in 1951 and would remain at Berkeley until retiring as professor in 1988. In 1953, Weaver and Robert Trumpler collaborated to publish a book titled Statistical Astronomy.

Beginning in 1956, Weaver worked to establish the Radio Astronomy Laboratory at Berkeley and was its director from 1958 until 1972. This included the Hat Creek Radio Observatory, where an 85-foot radio telescope was installed in 1962. This instrument was used for cm-wavelength observations, including the 21-cm interstellar hydrogen line and later hydroxyl (OH). He and Martin Schwarzschild studied the spectra from a balloon-bourne infrared telescope (Stratoscope II) launched in 1963 to examine Mars, and the experiment produced evidence of the amount of water vapor in the planet's atmosphere. In 1965, his team discovered the first astrophysical maser, which was then attributed to hydroxyl. He helped to map the local bubble.

Weaver gained high repute as a teacher and research mentor. Over his career, he published nearly 70 papers. Weaver served on the Berkeley Campus Facilities Committee, first as a member then as chair, which helped design and name the campus astronomy building, Campbell Hall. He served as treasurer for the American Astronomical Society (1977–1987) and president of the Astronomical Society of the Pacific (1971–1973). Weaver worked with the group that founded the Chabot Space and Science Center and served on its board. After the passing of his father in law, he helped found the Robert J. Trumpler Award of the ASP in 1974. From 1981 until 1986, he chaired the Scientific and Academic Advisory Committee of the Livermore and Los Alamos national laboratories.

Following his retirement in 1988, Weaver continued to maintain an interest by returning to the campus until well into his 90s. He died on April 26, 2017 at his home in Kensington, California at the age of 99. His family donated the house to fund the Trumpler-Weaver Endowed Professorship of Astronomy at UC Berkeley. His wife Cecile died in 2020.
