= OpenSonATA =

Open SonATA stands for Open SETI on the Allen Telescope Array and is the open source version of the software are used for signal detection by the SETI Institute on the Allen Telescope Array (ATA). The software currently runs on Linux and macOS operating systems and is intended to be ported to multiple platforms. The Allen Telescope Array uses the OpenSUSE operating system on the SonATA computers.

Before the release of the code to the public setiQuest had to find all instances that conflicted with the GPL license they looked to release it in.

With the release of Open SonATA 2.1, setiQuest released the source code to the public under the GPL License. setiQuest has included "ways to help" in their documentation of the software. The source code can be found in setiQuest's GitHub repository.

Open SonATA is closely related to the setiQuest project.
