= Trumpler 27 =

Possible open cluster in Scorpius

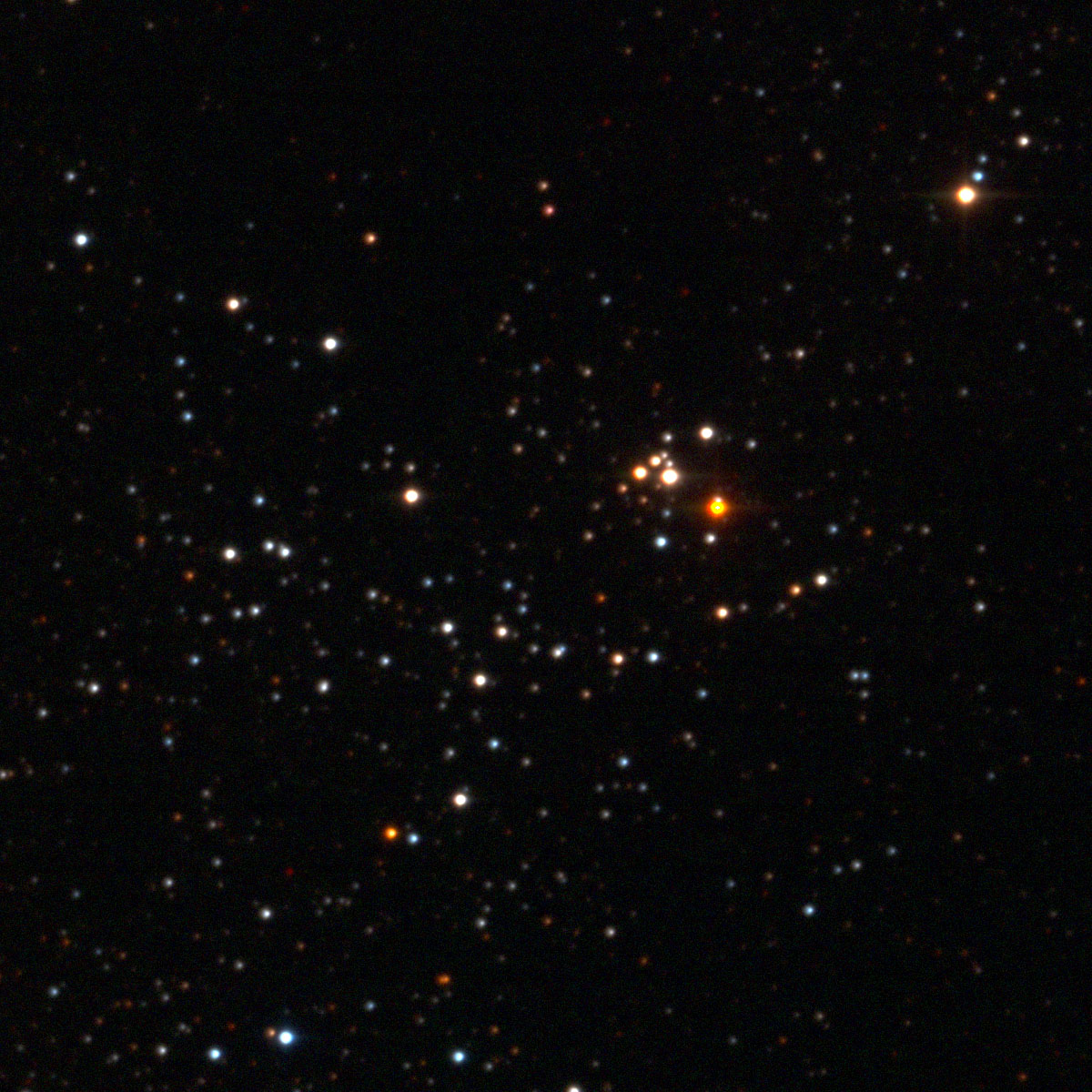

Observation data (J2000 epoch)
- Right ascension: 17^{h} 36^{m} 20^{s}
- Declination: −33° 31.0′
- Apparent magnitude (V): 6.7
- Apparent dimensions (V): 6′ × 6′

Physical characteristics
- True nature is unknown
- Other designations: C 1732-334

Associations
- Constellation: Scorpius

Trumpler 27 is a possible open cluster in the southern constellation Scorpius. If it exists, it is a few thousand light-years away from the Sun, with estimates ranging from 3,900 light-years (1,210 kiloparsecs) to 6,800 light-years (2,100 kiloparsecs) The name refers to Robert Julius Trumpler's catalog of open clusters, published in 1930.

It was originally thought to be young open cluster in the outer edge of the Sagittarius Arm, still surrounded by interstellar matter. The light from the stars is heavily extinguished and reddened by intervening interstellar dust. The light coming from the stars is also significantly polarized. However, a close study in 2012 could not confirm whether the stars truly form a cluster, or if they are a close alignment of bright stars.

Several member stars have been studied in closer detail. Star #1 of Trumpler 27 is CD−33°12241, a red supergiant star with a spectral type of M0Ia. Stars #28 and #105 are Wolf-Rayet stars. Star #27, a blue giant star with a spectral type of O8III((f)), may be one of the most luminous stars known, with a bolometric magnitude of −10.5. Star #102 is known as V925 Scorpii or HD 159378, and is a rare yellow supergiant star.

== See also ==
- List of most massive stars
