= Nia Imara =

American astrophysicist and artist

- Born: Oakland, California
- Education: Kenyon College (BA); University of California, Berkeley (PhD)
- Known for: Science and art
- Scientific career
- Workplaces: UC Santa Cruz; Center for Astrophysics | Harvard & Smithsonian
- Thesis: The Formation and Evolution of Giant Molecular Clouds (2010)
- Website: niaimara.com

Nia Imara is an American astrophysicist, artist, and activist. Imara's scientific work deals with galactic mass, star formation, and exoplanet detection. Imara was the first African-American woman to earn a PhD in astrophysics at the University of California, Berkeley and was the inaugural postdoctoral fellow in the Future Faculty Leaders program at Harvard University. In 2020, Imara joined the University of California, Santa Cruz as an assistant professor in the Department of Astronomy. Understanding cosmic belonging is what sparked some of her recent work, including 3D-printing models to aid visualization of molecular clouds.

== Early life and education ==
Imara was born in East Oakland, Oakland, California and grew up in the San Francisco Bay Area. She received her bachelor's degree from Kenyon College in 2003, majoring in mathematics and physics. While at Kenyon College, she competed on the college's swim team. She moved to the University of California, Berkeley for her postgraduate studies, and in 2010 she became the first African-American woman to earn a PhD in astrophysics at University of California, Berkeley. Her dissertation was on The Formation and Evolution of Giant Molecular Clouds and was supervised by Leo Blitz.

== Career ==
From 2014 to 2017, Imara was the inaugural postdoctoral fellow in the Future Faculty Leaders program at Harvard University. Her postdoctoral research focused on giant molecular clouds, the birth sites of stars, and the properties and cosmological effects of galactic and intergalactic dust. She used the world's largest fully steerable radio telescope, the Robert C. Byrd Green Bank Telescope, to conduct her research.

In 2017, she was appointed as the John Harvard Distinguished Science Fellow and the Harvard FAS Dean's Postdoctoral Fellow at the Harvard–Smithsonian Center for Astrophysics. Her work investigates the structure and evolution of stellar nurseries in both the Milky Way Galaxy and other galaxies throughout the universe, and she has developed a model that connects galaxy mass, star formation rates and dust temperatures.

In fall 2020, Imara joined the faculty in the Astronomy and Astrophysics Department at the University of California, Santa Cruz. Imara is an assistant professor of astronomy and astrophysics at UC Santa Cruz.

Together with Rosanne Di Stefano, Imara proposed a method for detecting exoplanets in X-ray binary star systems. Imara, Di Stefano, and their other collaborators found evidence, using the Chandra X-Ray Observatory, of a potential planet passing in front of a star that is 28 million light-years away in the M51 galaxy. Their findings were published to Nature Astronomy in an October 2021 paper entitled "A possible planet candidate in an external galaxy detected through X-ray transit." If the findings are confirmed, this would represent the first sighting of a planet outside of our Milky Way Galaxy.

To help visualize molecular clouds, Imara has developed a way to use "high-resolution bitmap-based three-dimensional (3D) printing" to create handheld models for teaching and outreach. These models, according to CNET, are "polished, baseball-size orbs that look like oversized marbles with swirling patterns inside." Models in 3D are better than 2D images because, says Imara, "when we’re looking at a flat picture, we often can’t tell how far a certain structure extends into the depth of the cloud. But when we have a tool like this 3D-printed object, it’s inherently interactive, and we can see a structure sort of winding its way through the cloud." In 2025, Imara published a new book, where she connected science to art, and how they are intwined together.

== Activism and community engagement ==
Imara is an advocate for equity in STEM. She founded the Equity and Inclusion Journal Club at Harvard University in 2018 which was originally co-organized with Dr. Anna Pancoast. She has visited South Africa and Ghana to teach and advocate in programs designed to increase diversity in astronomy and other STEM areas.

In 2020, Imara founded Onaketa, an organization that connects students from underserved communities of color with free math and science tutoring. By May of 2025, six tutors working with Onaketa had mentored over 100 students nationwide.

Imara has described the field of astronomy as a uniquely powerful tool for engaging the general public with, and expanding access to, science: "Everyone’s captivated by astronomy, by the stars, what’s out there in the universe...And so I made a conscious choice a long time ago that I wanted to share my work with the community, with Black folks and other people of color, especially.” Imara recently appeared as herself in the "Age of Stars" episode of the 2021 PBS Nova documentary series "Universe Revealed," as well as a short segment in Ancient Skies "Gods and Monsters" (TV Episode 2019).

Imara released book "Painting the Cosmos: How Art and Science Intersect to Reveal the Secrets of the Universe" on February 25, 2025. The book explores the wonder of the cosmos through an intertwine of art and astronomy.
