= NGC 5460 =

Open cluster in the constellation Centaurus

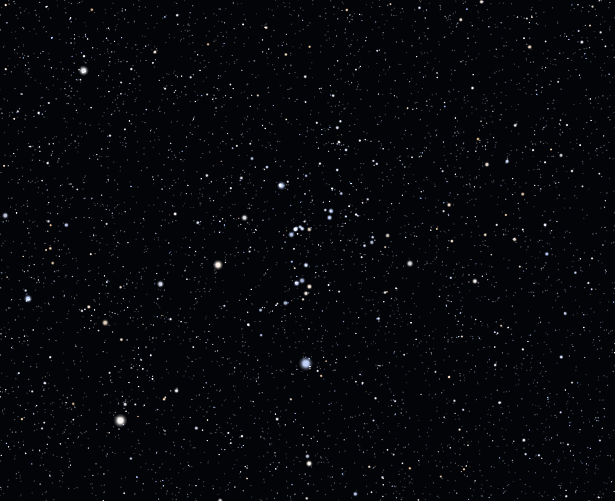

Observation data (J2000 epoch)
- Right ascension: 14^{h} 07^{m} 27^{s}
- Declination: −48° 20′ 36″
- Distance: 2,350 ly (720 pc)
- Apparent magnitude (V): 5.6
- Apparent dimensions (V): 23'

Physical characteristics
- Mass: 505 M_{☉}
- Estimated age: 160 million years
- Other designations: Collinder 280, Melotte 123

Associations
- Constellation: Centaurus

NGC 5460 is an open cluster in the constellation Centaurus. It is a bright but loose cluster of intermediate age located approximately 2,300 light years away from Earth. It is located nearly 2 degrees east-southeast of Zeta Centauri.

== Observation history ==
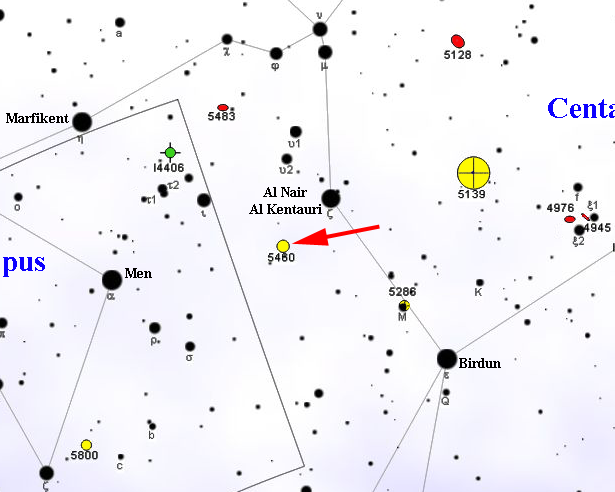
The location of NGC 5460

NGC 5460 was discovered by James Dunlop in 1826. He described it on May 7, 1826 as "a curiously curved line of small stars, of nearly equal magnitudes; two stars of 7th magnitude to the east" and added it to his catalog as number 431. John Herschel described as "a region of large bright stars of 8, 9... etc. magnitude; a very coarse cluster" and added it to General Catalogue as No. 3555. In the New General Catalogue it is described as "very large, very little concentrated, stars 8th magnitude and fainter".

== Characteristics ==
NGC 5460 is a loose open cluster, of Trumpler type II3m. There are 272 probable member stars within the angular radius of the cluster and 96 within the central part of the cluster. The tidal radius of the cluster is 4.1 - 8.2 parsecs (13 - 26 light years) and represents the average outer limit of NGC 5460, beyond which a star is unlikely to remain gravitationally bound to the cluster core.

A photometric study by Barrado and Byrne in 1995 studied 353 stars near the core of the cluster and identified 25 members and 27 possible members. They estimated the age of the cluster to be 110 mys and its distance to be 740 pc and identified three stars, members and possible members, as variable. A spectrographic study of the cluster by Fossati et al. (2011) estimated the distance of the cluster to be 720 ± 50 pc, its age log t=8.2 ± 0.1 and the mean radial velocity −17.9 ± 5.2 km/s. The metallicity of the cluster is slightly higher than the solar one (Z = 0.013).

The brightest of the members is HD 123226 (mag. 8.98, B8), which is also the hottest star of the cluster. One more star, HD 122983, (mag. 9.77, B9.5IV/V) has been found to be variable, with period 3.4 days. It is a He-weak star. Other chemically peculiar stars within the cluster are HD 123182 (He-weak star of an unclear type, mag. 9.88, spectral type B9), and UCAC 11105038 (mag. 11.59, A8). Also, the hotter component of the HD 123225 system may be an HgMn star.
