= Astronomical Society of the Pacific =

American scientific and educational organization

- Abbreviation: ASP
- Founded: February 7, 1889
- Tax ID no.: 94-0294860
- Legal status: Nonprofit organization; 501(c)-3 status
- Purpose: The ASP is creating a future where science is a language everyone speaks and astronomy becomes the bridge between knowledge, imagination, innovation, and better lives for all.
- Location: San Francisco, California
- Region served: Worldwide
- CEO: Hakeem Oluseyi
- Board President: Enrico Ramirez-Ruiz
- Affiliations: American Association for the Advancement of Science
- Website: www.astrosociety.org

The Astronomical Society of the Pacific (ASP) is an American scientific and educational organization, founded in San Francisco on February 7, 1889, immediately following the solar eclipse of January 1, 1889. Its name derives from its origins on the Pacific Coast, but today it has members all over the country and the world. It has the legal status of a nonprofit organization.

It is the largest general astronomy education society in the world, with members from over 40 countries.

== Education and outreach programs ==
The ASP's mission is to promote public interest in and awareness of astronomy (and increase scientific literacy) through its publications, web site, and many educational and outreach programs.

- The NASA Night Sky Network – a community of more than 400 astronomy clubs across the U.S. that share their time and telescopes to engage the public with unique astronomy experiences. The ASP provides training and materials to enhance clubs outreach activities, and inspires more than four million people through their participation in 30,000+ plus events.
- Eclipse Ambassadors Off the Path is a NASA partner program to prepare 500 communities off the path of the 2024 Total Eclipse with the awe and science of solar eclipses. Partnering eclipse enthusiasts and undergraduate students create new partnerships with underserved audiences in their community.
- Reaching for the Stars: NASA Science for Girl Scouts – The ASP is partnered on a NASA project to create new astronomy badges for Girl Scouts, connect them with their local astronomy clubs, and train amateur astronomers to make their outreach more girl-friendly. The ASP also connects adult Girl Scout volunteers to NASA's Night Sky Network (NSN).
- My Sky Tonight – a set of research-based, science-rich astronomy activities that engage pre-kindergarten aged children, and trained hundreds of educators at museums, parks, and libraries across the U.S. on how to effectively engage their youngest visitors (ages 3–5) in astronomy.
- The AAS Astronomy Ambassadors Program – provides mentoring and training experiences for young astronomers just starting their careers. The American Astronomical Society, in partnership with the ASP, members of the Center for Astronomy Education (CAE), and other organizations active in science education and public outreach, has created the program, which involves a series of professional-development workshops and a community of practice designed to help improve participants communication skills and effectiveness in doing outreach to students and the public.
- On-the-Spot Assessment – a research-to-practice initiative led by the ASP (in collaboration with Oregon State University, the Portal to the Public Network via the Institute for Learning Innovation, and the National Radio Astronomy Observatory) to develop a set of embedded assessment strategies and professional development to support research scientists in effectively communicating science to the public.
- The Galileoscope Project – Developed in 2009 for the International Year of Astronomy, the Galileoscope has become the centerpiece for teaching about telescopes in many programs. As a key component of the Galileo Teacher Training Program, the Astronomical Society of the Pacific engaged hundreds of educators in professional development related to telescopes and the Galileoscope.
- Project PLANET – Leveraging resources developed as a part of the My Sky Tonight project to explore their usefulness in a formal, classroom setting.
- Project ASTRO – a national program that improves the teaching of astronomy and physical science (using hands-on inquiry-based activities) by pairing amateur and professional astronomers with 4th through 9th grade teachers and classes.
- Family ASTRO – a project that develops kits and games to help families enjoy astronomy in their leisure time and trains astronomers, educators, and community leaders.
- Astronomy from the Ground Up (AFGU) – Providing informal science educators and interpreters with new and innovative ways to communicate astronomy. AFGU is a growing community of hundreds of educators from museums, science centers, nature centers, and parks around the U.S., who are actively enhancing and expanding their capacity to address astronomy topics for their visitors.
- Classroom activities, videos, and resources in astronomy (many developed by the Society's educational staff) are sold through their online AstroShop or made available free through the website.

The ASP assists with astronomy education and outreach by partnering with other organizations both in the United States and internationally, and organizes an annual meeting to promote the appreciation and understanding of astronomy.

== Publications ==
The society promotes astronomy education through several publications. The Universe in the Classroom, a free electronic educational newsletter for teachers and other educators around the world who help students of all ages learn more about the wonders of the universe through astronomy.

Mercury, the ASP's quarterly on-line membership magazine, covers a wide range of astronomy topics, from history and archaeoastronomy to cutting-edge developments. First published in 1925 as the Leaflets of the ASP, Mercury is now disseminated to thousands of ASP members and schools, universities, libraries, observatories, and institutions around the world. Mercury Online, a publicly accessible companion blog for Mercury, was established in 2019 "to showcase articles by our expert columnists after they've been published in Mercury magazine."

The ASP also publishes the journal Publications of the Astronomical Society of the Pacific (PASP) aimed at professional astronomers. The PASP is a technical journal of refereed papers on astronomical research covering all wavelengths and distance scales as well as papers on the latest innovations in astronomical instrumentation and software, and has been publishing journals since 1889.

The Astronomical Society of the Pacific Conference Series (ASPCS) is a series of over 400 volumes of professional astronomy conference proceedings. Started in 1988, the Conference Series has grown to become a prominent publication series in the world of professional astronomy publications, and has published over 500 volumes. Volumes are sold to the attendees of the conferences of which the proceedings are published, as well as being offered through the Astronomical Society of the Pacific's AstroShop, and can be found in the libraries of major universities and research institutions worldwide. In 2004, the ASPCS stepped into electronic publishing, offering electronic access subscriptions for libraries and institutions, as well as individual access to volumes which they have purchased in hard copy form.

AstroBeat is an on-line ASP-membership column, which comes out every other week, and features a behind-the-scenes report on some aspect of astronomical discovery, astronomy education, or astronomy as a hobby, written by a key participant. Authors have included:

- Clyde Tombaugh, retelling the story of his discovery of the (dwarf) planet Pluto
- Michael E. Brown, discussing the naming of the dwarf planet Makemake
- Noted astronomical photographer David Malin describing the transition from chemical to digital photography
- Virginia Louise Trimble explaining how she selected her list of the top ten astronomical discoveries of the last thousand years.

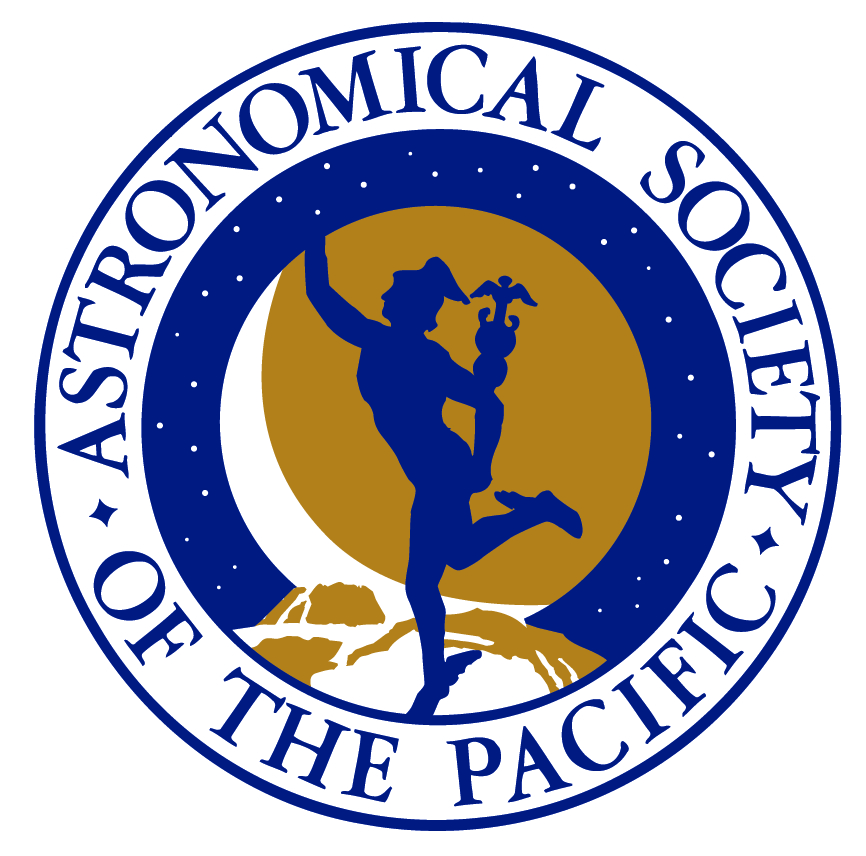
The old ASP's logo design until it was updated in 2019

== Awards ==
The ASP makes several different awards annually:

- The Bruce Medal for lifetime contribution to astronomy research. The medal is named after Catherine Wolfe Bruce.
- The Klumpke-Roberts Award for outstanding contributions to the public understanding and appreciation of astronomy, named for Dorothea Klumpke-Roberts.
- The Gordon Myers Amateur Achievement Awards (formerly the Amateur Achievement Award), in recognition of significant contributions to astronomy by one not employed in the field of astronomy in a professional capacity.
- The Bart Bok Award, named in honor of astronomer Bart Bok, awarded jointly with the American Astronomical Society to outstanding student projects in astronomy at the International Science and Engineering Fair.
- The Thomas Brennan Award for exceptional achievement related to the teaching of astronomy at the high school level.
- The Maria and Eric Muhlmann Award for recent significant observational results made possible by innovative advances in astronomical instrumentation, software, or observational infrastructure.
- The Robert J. Trumpler Award, named in honor of astronomer Robert J. Trumpler, given to a recent recipient of a Ph.D degree with a particularly notable thesis.
- The Richard Emmons Award is given for a lifetime of contributions to the teaching of astronomy to college non-science majors.
- The Las Cumbres Amateur Outreach Award, established by Wayne Rosing and Dorothy Largay, seeks to honor outstanding educational outreach by an amateur astronomer to K-12 children and the interested lay public.
- The Arthur B.C. Walker II Award, first announced in 2016, for research and teaching with a substantial commitment to students from underrepresented groups.

== Defunct awards ==
- The Donohoe Comet Medal (1890–1950). In July 1889 the ASP announced that a bronze medal for "the actual discovery of any unexpected comet" would be awarded on the basis of a $500 gift by Joseph A. Donohoe of San Francisco. The first award was made in March 1890 to W. R. Brooks for the discovery of the comet now known as 16P/Brooks. After the 250th medal had been awarded in 1950 the award was discontinued because photography had enabled the discovery of too many comets.
- The Comet Medal (1969–1974). In 1968 the ASP Board voted to create a new Comet Medal to be awarded once yearly to recognize "an outstanding nonprofessional astronomer" for "past contributions to the study of comets." The first award was made in 1969 to Reginald L. Waterfield. After 1974, the Comet Medal was discontinued.

== Affiliations ==
The Astronomical Society of the Pacific is an affiliate of the American Association for the Advancement of Science.

== Society presidents ==
Presidents of the ASP have typically served one to three year terms. Past presidents have included such notable astronomers as Edwin Hubble, George O. Abell, and Frank Drake. George Pardee, who later became Governor of the State of California, served as president in 1899.

=== 21st century ===
- 2025–present Enrico Ramirez-Ruiz (U. of California, Santa Cruz)
- 2023–2025 Derrick Pitts
- 2019–2023 Kelsey Johnson (University of Virginia, National Radio Astronomy Observatory)
- 2017–2019 Chris Ford (Pixar Animation Studios, ret.)
- 2015–2017 Connie Walker (National Optical Astronomy Observatory)
- 2013–2015 Gordon Myers (IBM, ret.)
- 2011–2013 William A. Gutsch (St Peters College, Jersey City)
- 2009–2011 Bruce Partridge (Haverford College)
- 2007–2009 James B. Kaler (U. of Illinois)
- 2005–2007 Dennis Schatz (Pacific Science Center, Seattle)
- 2003–2005 Catharine Garmany (U. of Colorado; National Optical Astronomy Observatories)
- 2001–2003 Alexei Filippenko (U. of California, Berkeley)
- 1999–2001 Frank N. Bash (U. of Texas)

=== 20th century ===
- 1997–1999 John R. Percy (U. of Toronto)
- 1995–1997 Bruce Carney (U. of North Carolina)
- 1993–1995 Russell Merle Genet (Fairborn Observatory)
- 1991–1993 Julie Lutz (Washington State U.)
- 1989–1991 Frank Drake (U. of California, Santa Cruz)
- 1987–1989 James Hesser (Dominion Astrophysical Observatory)
- 1985–1987 Sidney Wolff (U. of Hawaii, NOAO)
- 1983–1985 David Morrison (U. of Hawaii & NASA Ames)
- 1981–1983 Halton Arp (Hale Observatories)
- 1979–1981 Leonard Kuhi (U. of California, Berkeley)
- 1977–1979 Ann Boesgaard (U. of Hawaii)
- 1975–1977 Geoffrey Burbidge (U. of California, San Diego)
- 1973–1975 Ray Weymann (U. of Arizona)
- 1971–1973 Harold Weaver (U. of California, Berkeley)
- 1969–1971 George O. Abell (U. of California, Los Angeles)
- 1967–1969 Helmut Abt (Kitt Peak National Observatory)
- 1965–1967 Louis G. Henyey (U. of California, Berkeley)
- 1962–1965 Robert Petrie (Dominion Astrophysical Observatory)
- 1960–1962 Seth Barnes Nicholson (Mt. Wilson-Palomar Observatories; 2nd term)
- 1958–1959 Nicholas Mayall (Lick Observatory; 2nd term)
- 1956–1957 Andrew McKellar (Dominion Astrophysical Observatory)
- 1954–1955 Olin Chaddock Wilson (Mt. Wilson & Palomar Observatories)
- 1952–1953 Gerald Kron (Lick Observatory)
- 1951 Otto Struve (U. of California, Berkeley)
- 1950 Dinsmore Alter (Griffith Observatory)
- 1949 Robert Julius Trumpler (U. of California, Berkeley; 2nd term)
- 1948 Ira Sprague Bowen (Mt. Wilson Observatory)
- 1947 C. Donald Shane (Lick Observatory; 2nd term)
- 1946 Ralph Elmer Wilson (Mt. Wilson Observatory)
- 1945 Ferdinand Neubauer (Lick Observatory)
- 1944 Roscoe Frank Sanford (Mt. Wilson Observatory)
- 1943 Armin Otto Leuschner (University of California, Berkeley; 3rd term)
- 1942 Nicholas Mayall (Lick Observatory)
- 1941 Arthur Scott King (Mt. Wilson Observatory)
- 1940 C. Donald Shane (University of California, Berkeley)
- 1939 Alfred Harrison Joy (Mt. Wilson Observatory; 2nd term)
- 1938 Hamilton Jeffers (Lick Observatory)
- 1937 Harold D. Babcock (Mt. Wilson Observatory)
- 1936 Armin Otto Leuschner (U. of California, Berkeley; 2nd term)
- 1935 Seth Barnes Nicholson (Mt. Wilson Observatory)
- 1934 Sturla Einarsson (U. of California, Berkeley)
- 1933 Edwin Hubble (Mt. Wilson Observatory)
- 1932 Robert Julius Trumpler (Lick Observatory)
- 1931 Alfred Harrison Joy (Mt. Wilson Observatory)
- 1930 William Meyer (U. of California, Berkeley)
- 1929 Frederick Hanley Seares (Mt. Wilson Observatory)
- 1928 Joseph Haines Moore (Lick Observatory; 2nd term)
- 1927 Paul W. Merrill (Mt. Wilson Observatory)
- 1926 Bernard Benfield (2nd term)
- 1925 Bernard Benfield (San Francisco engineer)
- 1924 Arthur Black (San Francisco banker)
- 1923 Walter Sydney Adams (U. of California, Berkeley)
- 1922 Exum Lewis (U. of California, Berkeley)
- 1921 Charles Cushing (San Francisco attorney, 2nd term)
- 1920 Joseph Haines Moore (Lick Observatory)
- 1919 Beverly L. Hodghead (San Francisco, attorney)
- 1918 William Wallace Campbell (Lick Observatory, 3rd term)
- 1917 Frank Cornish (San Francisco)
- 1916 Sidney Dean Townley (Stanford U., 2nd term)
- 1915 Robert Grant Aitken (Lick Observatory; 2nd term)
- 1914 Russell Crawford (U. of California, Berkeley)
- 1913 Alexander George McAdie (U.S. Weather Bureau)
- 1912 Heber Curtis (Lick Observatory)
- 1912 John Galloway (Berkeley)
- 1911 Fremont Morse (U.S. Coast and Geodetic Survey)
- 1910 William Wallace Campbell (Lick Observatory, 2nd term)
- 1909 Charles Burckhalter (Chabot Observatory, 2nd term)
- 1908 Charles Cushing (San Francisco attorney)
- 1907 Armin Otto Leuschner (U. of California, Berkeley)
- 1906 Sidney Dean Townley (Latitude Observatory, Ukiah)
- 1905 George Edwards (University of California, Berkeley)
- 1904 Otto von Geldern (San Francisco)
- 1903 Charles Dillon Perrine (Lick Observatory)
- 1902 John Dolbeer (San Francisco lumber businessman)
- 1901 James Edward Keeler (Lick Observatory)

=== 19th century ===
- 1900 George Pardee (eye doctor and Governor of California)
- 1899 Robert Grant Aitken (Lick Observatory)
- 1898 William Alvord (San Francisco merchant/banker; Bank of California president; 14th mayor of San Francisco)
- 1897 William Hussey (Lick Observatory) and William Alvord (San Francisco bank president)
- 1896 Charles Burckhalter (Chabot Observatory; Co-founder)
- 1895 William Wallace Campbell (Lick Observatory)
- 1894 Eusebius Molera (San Francisco civil engineer)
- 1893 John Martin Schaeberle (Lick Observatory)
- 1892 William Montgomery Pierson (San Francisco attorney; drew up Society's articles of incorporation)
- 1889–1891 Edward Singleton Holden (Lick Observatory; Founder)

== See also ==
- List of astronomical societies

== Sources ==
- History of the Astronomical Society of the Pacific
