= Stellar age estimation =

Methods for estimating the age of a star

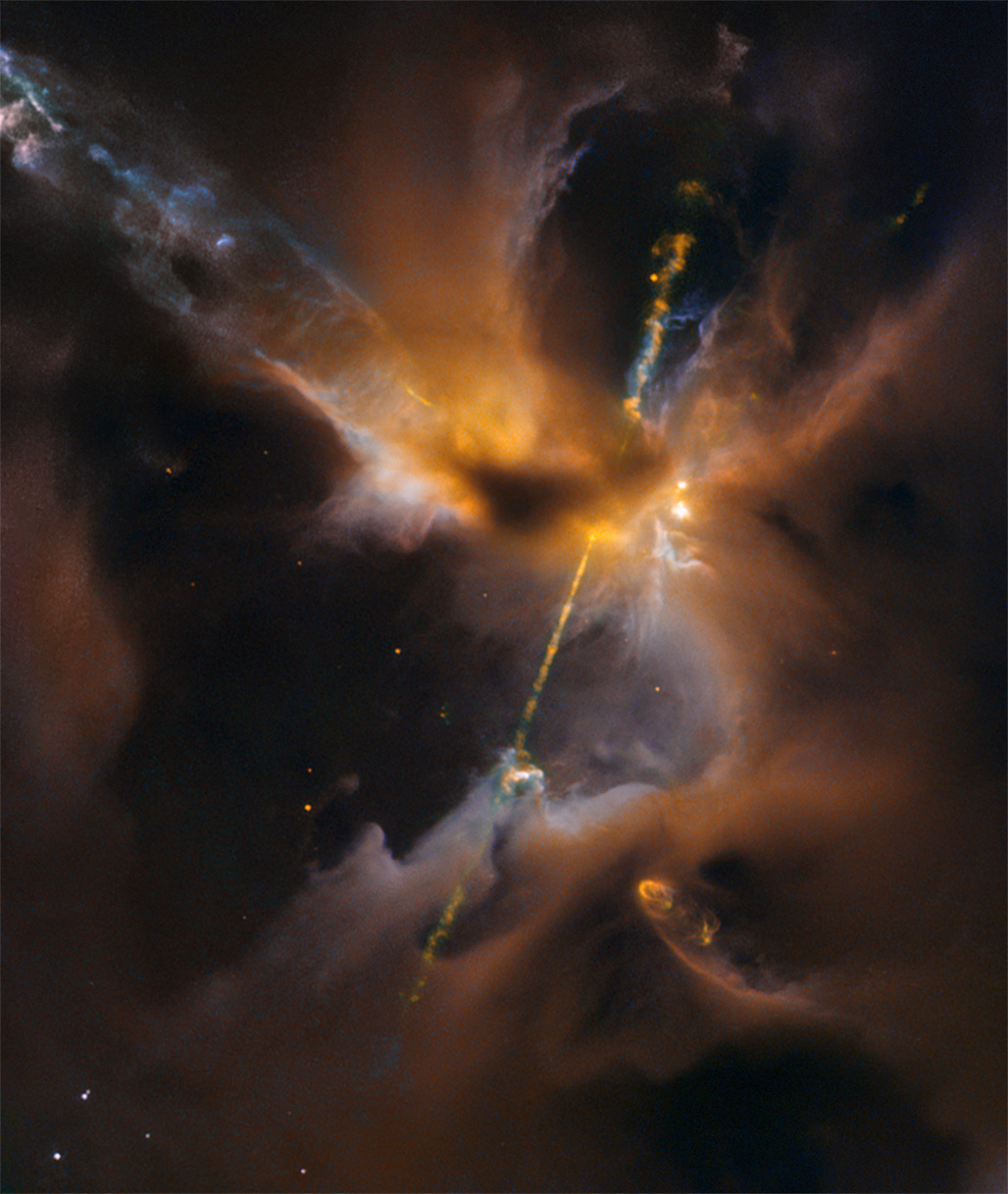
Young star ejecting two jets of energised gas

Various methods and tools are involved in stellar age estimation, an attempt to identify within reasonable degrees of confidence what the age of a star is. These methods include stellar evolutionary models, membership in a given star cluster or system, fitting the star with the standard spectral and luminosity classification system, and the presence of a protoplanetary disk, among others. Nearly all of the methods of determining age require knowledge of the mass of the star, which can be known through various methods. No individual method can provide accurate results for all types of stars.

== Luminosity increase and the Hertzsprung–Russell diagram ==
As stars grow older, their luminosity increases at an appreciable rate. Given the mass of the star, one can use this rate of increase in luminosity in order to determine the age of the star. This method only works for calculating stellar age on the main sequence, because in advanced evolutionary stages of the star, such as the red giant stage, the standard relationship for the determination of age no longer holds. However, when one can observe a red giant star with a known mass, one can calculate the main-sequence lifetime, and thus the minimum age of star is known given that it is in an advanced stage of its evolution. As the star spends only about 1% of its total lifetime as a red giant, this is an accurate method of determining age.

== Field stars ==
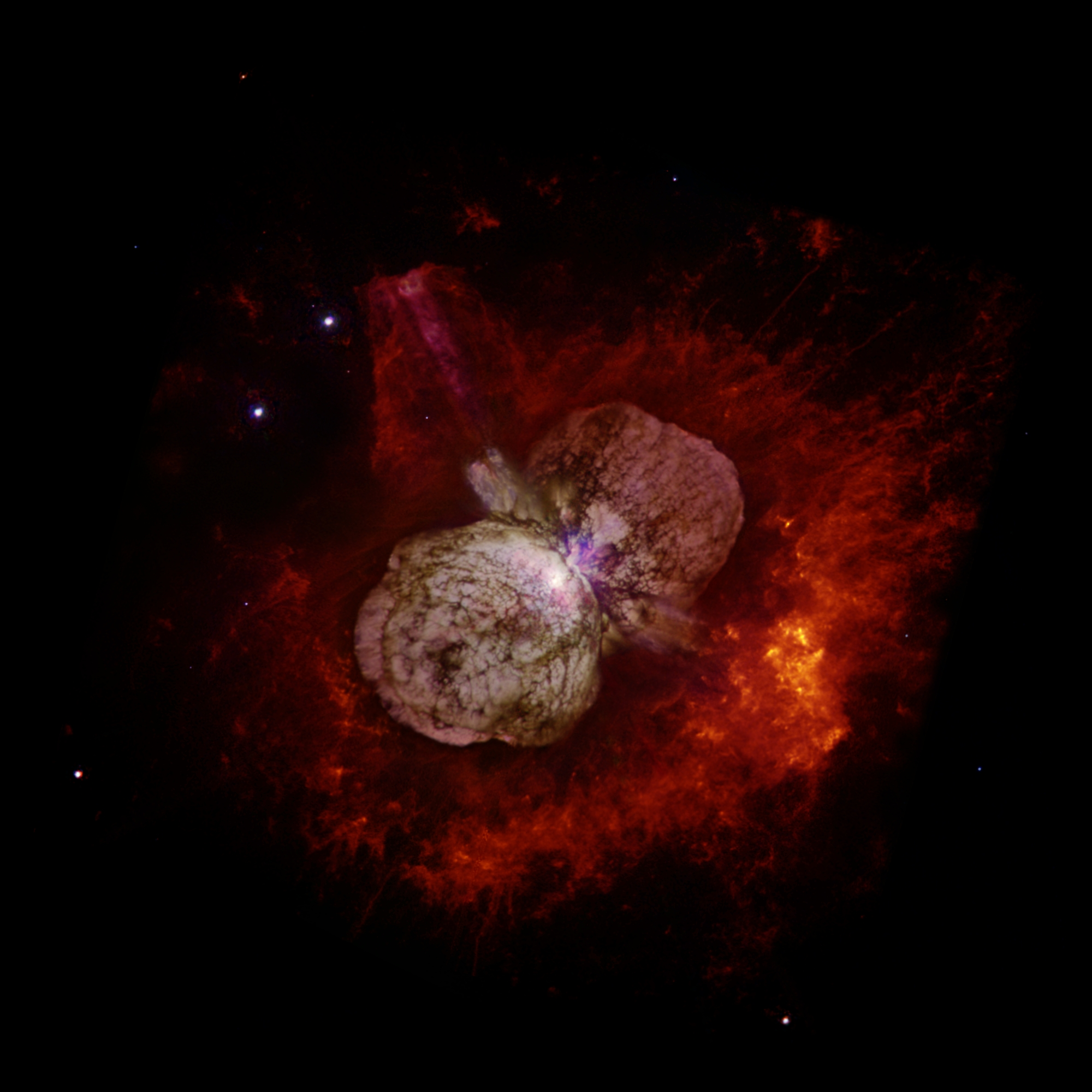
Eta Carinae, a star system that is violently ejecting gas

Various properties of stars can also be used to determine their age. For example, the Eta Carinae system is emitting large quantities of gas and dust. These enormous outbursts can be used to infer that the star system is nearing the end of its life, and will explode as a supernova within a relatively short period of astronomical time. Very large stars like VY Canis Majoris, one of the largest stars known, together with NML Cygni, VX Sagittarii and Trumpler 27-1 all have radii larger than that of the average orbital radius of Jupiter in the Solar System, thus showing that they are in extremely late evolutionary stages. Betelgeuse in particular is expected to die in a supernova explosion within the next million years.

As well as the scenarios of supermassive stars violently casting off their outer layers before their deaths, other examples can be found of the properties of stars which illustrate their age. For example, Cepheid variables have a characteristic pattern in their lightcurves, the rate of repetition of which is dependent on the luminosity of the star. Since Cepheid variables are a relatively short evolutionary stage in the lifecycle of stars, and knowing the mass of the star allows for the star to be tracked in its evolutionary path, one can estimate the age of the Cepheid variable.

Exceptional stellar properties which allow for an estimation of age are not confined to advanced evolutionary stages. When a roughly solar-mass star exhibits T Tauri variability, astronomers can locate the age of the star as being before the beginning of the main sequence phase of the star's life. Additionally, more massive pre-main-sequence stars could be Herbig Ae/Be stars. If a red dwarf star is emitting immense stellar flares and x-rays, the star can be calculated to be in an early stage of its main-sequence lifetime, after which it will become less variable and become stable.

== Membership in a star cluster or system ==
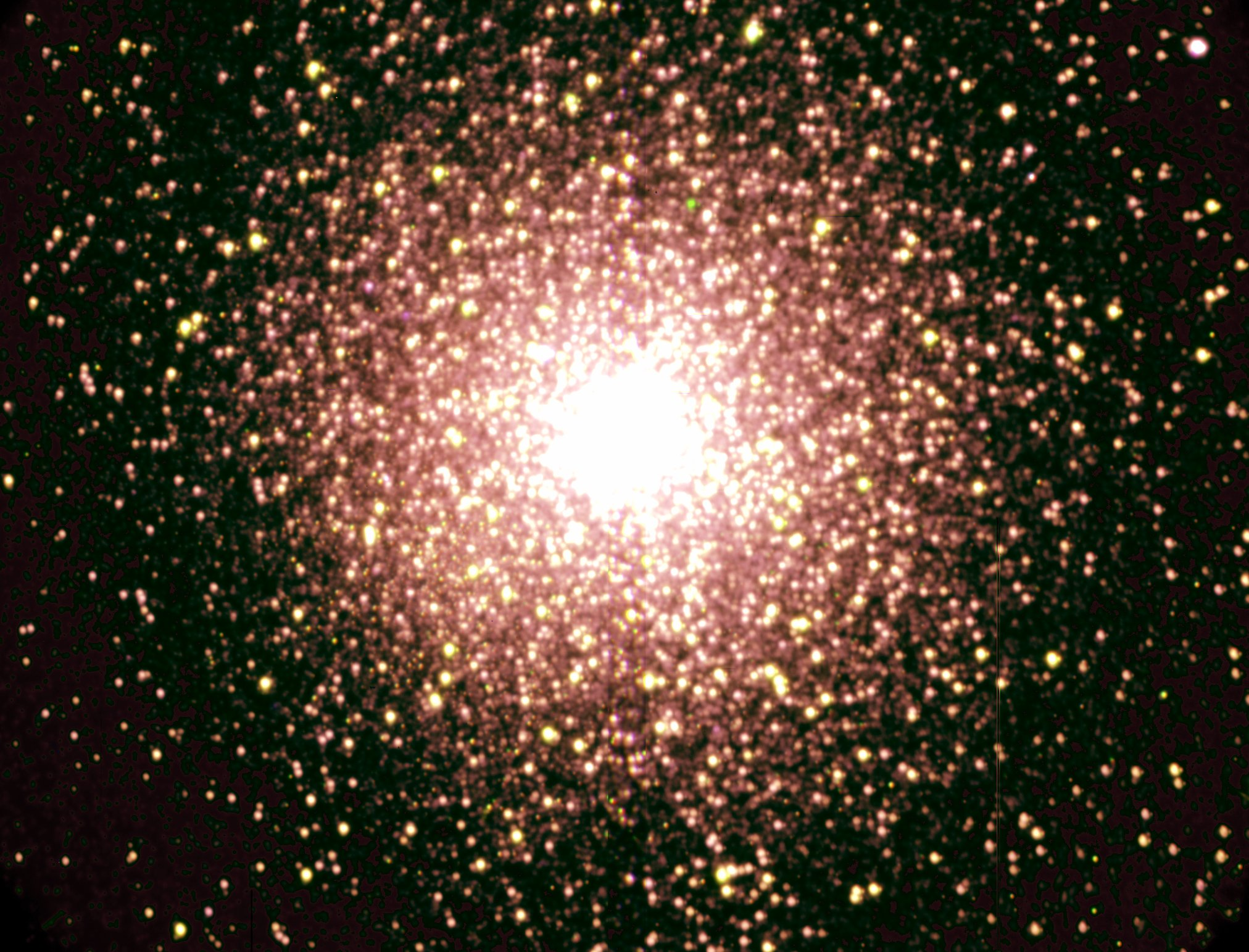
47 Tucanae, a globular cluster

Membership in a star cluster or star system permits an assignment of rough ages to a large number of stars present within. When one can determine the age of stars through other methods, such as the ones listed above, one can identify the age of all of the bodies in a system. This is especially useful in clusters of stars which exhibit a large amount of variety in their stellar masses, evolutionary stages, and classifications. While not entirely independent of the properties of the stars in the cluster, system, or other reasonably-sized association of stars, an astronomer would only need a representative sample of stars to determine the age of the cluster, rather than painstakingly finding the age of every star in the cluster through other properties.

In addition, knowing the age of one member of a star system can help determine the age of that system. In a star system, stars almost always form at the same time as each other, and given the age of one star, the age of all of the others can be known.

However, this method does not work for galaxies. These units are much larger, and are not merely a one-off creation of stars which allows their age to be determined in this fashion. The creation of stars in a galaxy takes place over billions of years, even though star production may long since have ceased (see elliptical galaxy). The oldest stars in a galaxy can only set a minimum age for the galaxy (when star formation began) but by no means determine the actual age.

== Presence of a protoplanetary disk ==
Along with other factors, the presence of a protoplanetary disk sets a maximum limit on the age of stars. Stars with protoplanetary disks are typically young, having moved onto the main sequence only a relatively short time ago. Over time, this disk would coalesce to form planets, with leftover material being deposited into various asteroid belts and other similar locations. However, the presence of pulsar planets complicates this method as a determinant of age.

== Gyrochronology ==
Gyro-chronology is a method used to determine the age of field stars by measuring their rotation rate, and then comparing this rate with the rotation rate of the Sun, which serves as a precalibrated clock for this measurement. This method has been seen as a more accurate method for the determination of stellar ages than other methods for field stars.

== See also ==
- Gyrochronology
- Stellar evolution
