= Robert Julius Trumpler =

Swiss-American astronomer (1886–1956)

- Born: Robert Julius Trümpler; October 2, 1886; Zurich, Switzerland
- Died: September 10, 1956 (aged 69); Berkeley, California, U.S.
- Citizenship: Swiss · American
- Education: Universität Zürich; University of Göttingen (PhD)
- Employer(s): University of California, Berkeley; Allegheny Observatory; Lick Observatory
- Organization: United States National Academy of Sciences
- Known for: Galactic cluster Trumpler classification

Robert Julius Trumpler (October 2, 1886 – September 10, 1956) was a Swiss-American astronomer.

== Career ==
Born in Switzerland on October 2, 1886, where Trumpler did initial schooling. Trumpler entered the Universität Zürich but later transferred to the University of Göttingen where he earned his PhD in 1910. In 1915, during World War I, he emigrated to the United States and joined the University of California, Berkeley. He took a position at Allegheny Observatory, and later went to Lick Observatory. In 1921, he became a naturalized citizen of the United States. He was elected a member of the United States National Academy of Sciences in 1932.

He is most noted for observing that the brightness of the more distant open clusters was lower than expected, and the stars appeared more red. This was explained by the interstellar dust scattered through the galaxy, resulting in the absorption (extinction) of light or interstellar extinction of light.

Trumpler further studied and catalogued open clusters in order to determine the size of the Milky Way galaxy. At first he thought his analysis placed an upper limit on the Milky Way's diameter of about 10,000 parsecs with the Sun located somewhat near the center although he later revised this. While cataloguing open clusters, he also devised a system for their classification according to the number of stars observed within them, how concentrated these stars are in the center of the cluster and the range of their apparent brightness. This system, known as the Trumpler classification, is still in use today.

== Honors ==
The Robert J. Trumpler Award, awarded by the Astronomical Society of the Pacific for an outstanding PhD Thesis in astronomy, is named in his honor.

The following celestial features are named after him:

- The crater Trumpler on the Moon.
- Trumpler Crater on Mars.
- Trumpler classification, the classification scheme for open clusters.
- Trumpler catalogue, the catalogue of open clusters that he compiled.

== Trumpler Classification for open star clusters ==
Trumpler's classification method for open star clusters is still currently in use by astronomers. It classifies the star cluster according to three features: Degree of concentration, range of magnitude (brightness) for the stars found in the cluster and the number of stars in the cluster. Degree of concentration is given a number from 1 to 4 in Roman numerals (number I indicating a strong central concentration, II indicating little central concentration, III indicates no noticeable concentration and IV little difference from the surrounding stellar population).

Range of magnitude is classified in a scale 1 to 3 and is written in Arabic numerals. Number 1 indicates most stars within the cluster have a very similar apparent brightness. 2 indicates a medium range across the stars in the cluster and 3 indicates a significant difference in brightness, from very bright to very faint stars.

The third feature classifies the number of stars inside the cluster and it uses letters. Letter 'p' indicates a poor cluster, containing less than 50 stars. Letter 'm' indicates a medium amount of 50 to 100 stars. Letter 'r' indicates a rich cluster, containing more than a 100 stars. Finally, the letter 'n' is attributed to all star clusters where some sort of nebulosity is present. For example, NGC 5460 is classified as a II3m, an open cluster with little central concentration, significant difference in brightness among its stars and 50 to 100 stars within the cluster. Since no nebulosity is detected, the letter n is not attributed to it.

== Notable objects ==
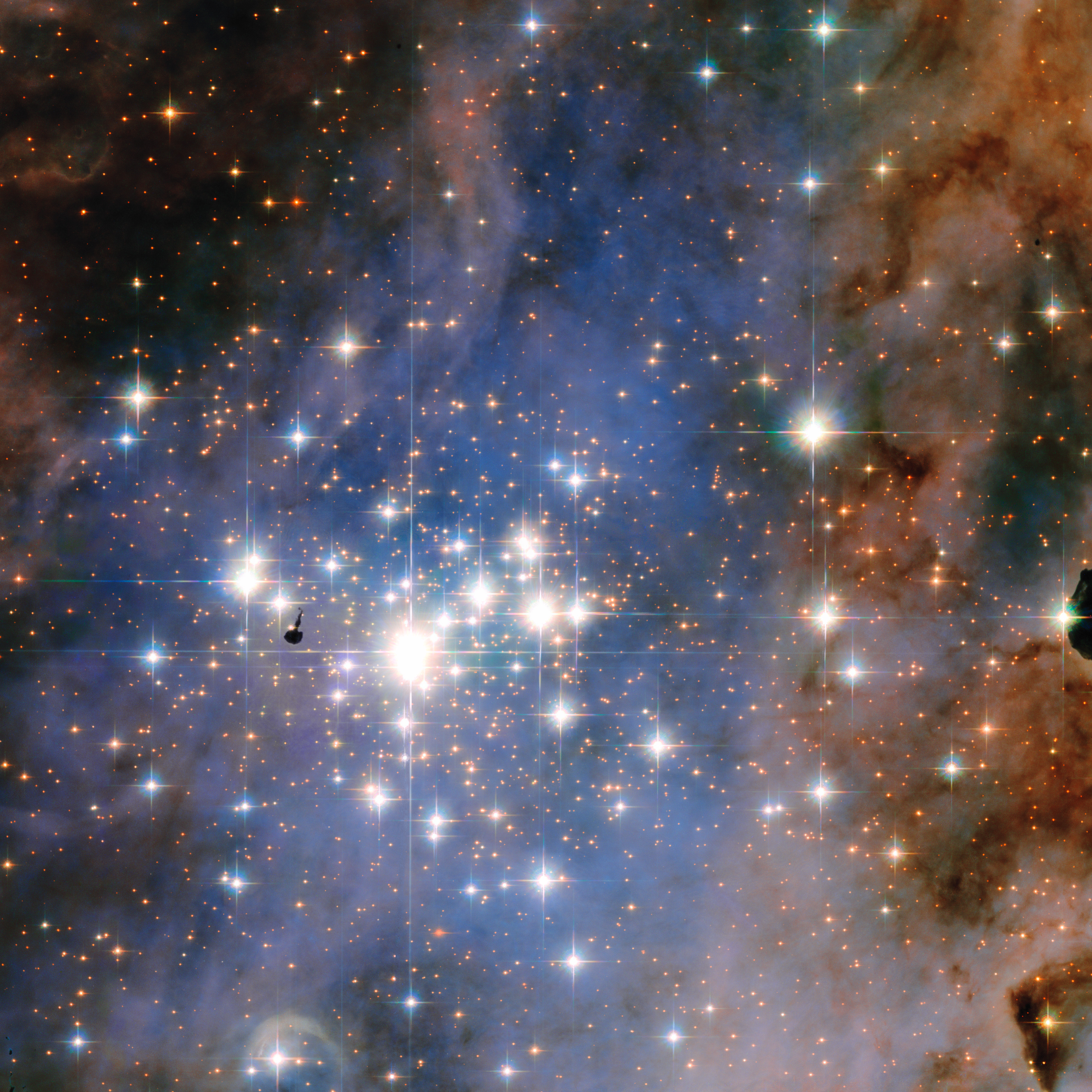
Trumpler 14, an open cluster in the constellation Carina

Some notable objects from his 1930 catalogue of open clusters are:

- Trumpler 2
- Trumpler 14
- Trumpler 15
- Trumpler 16
- Trumpler 27

Chart of Trumpler catalogue objects

== Selected publications ==
- R.J. Trumpler, 1930. "Preliminary results on the distances, dimensions and space distribution of open star clusters." Lick Obs. Bull. Vol XIV, No. 420 (1930) 154–188. An. 1–37 in Table 16 are Table 17 and constitute the Trumpler catalog of open clusters, referred to as "Trumpler (or Tr) 1–37
- Robert Julius Trumpler, Harold F. Weaver 1962. Statistical Astronomy (Dover Publications, New York). (reprinted from original published by the University of California, Berkeley, 1953)

== See also ==
- List of astronomical catalogues
- Melotte catalogue - a similar catalogue of star clusters published by Philibert Jacques Melotte in 1915.
- Collinder catalogue - a similar catalogue of open star clusters published by Per Collinder in 1931, one year after Trumpler.
