= Hat Creek Radio Observatory =

Observatory in northern California, USA

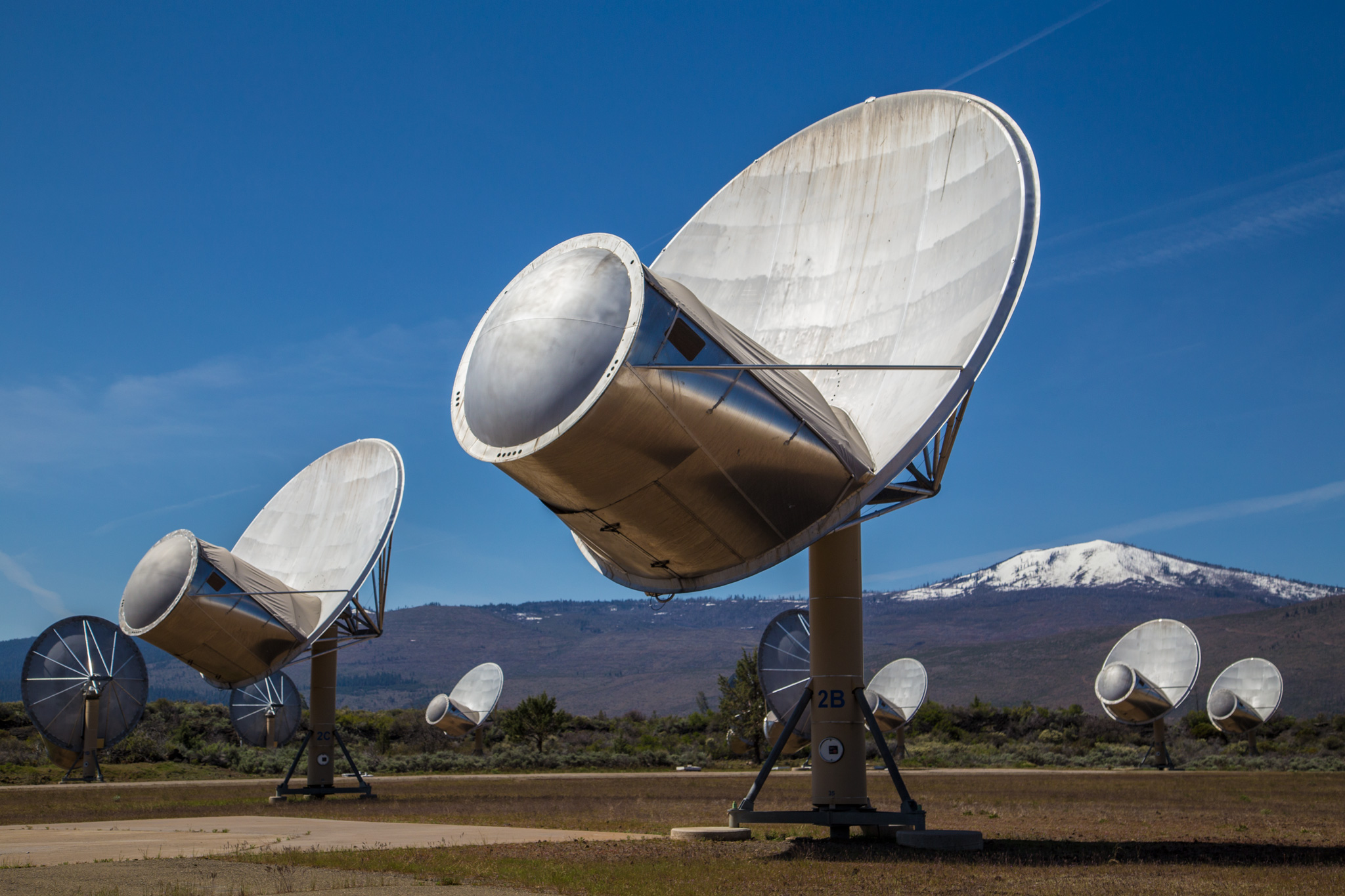
- Alternative names: HCRO
- Location: California, Pacific States Region
- Coordinates: 40°49′04″N 121°28′23″W
- Website: seti.org/hcro
- Telescopes: Allen Telescope Array; Berkeley-Illinois-Maryland Association

The Hat Creek Radio Observatory (HCRO) is operated by the SETI Institute in the Western United States. The observatory is home to the Allen Telescope Array and one of the three CHIME FRB outriggers, as well a number of other smaller telescopes and instruments.

== Location ==
Hat Creek Radio Observatory is located approximately 467 km (290 mi) northeast of San Francisco, California at an elevation of 986 m (3235 ft) above Sea Level in Hat Creek, California (in Shasta County). Latitude: 40° 49' 03" N; longitude: 121° 28' 24" W.

The nearest large city to Hat Creek is Redding, California on highway I-5.

== History ==
HCRO was founded in the late 1950s by the newly created Radio Astronomy Laboratory (an Organized Research Unit of the Astronomy Department at the University of California, Berkeley). An 85-foot antenna was installed in 1962 and operated until 1993, when it collapsed during a wind storm. Using it, astronomers discovered the first astrophysical maser. The university managed the facility until 2012, when SRI International assumed site management. The SETI Institute started a refurbishment and upgrade program for the ATA in 2019, and in 2020 it also took over the operation of the observatory from SRI.

The earliest experiments in millimeter-wave astronomy were performed at this site starting in the 1970s when a 2-element interferometer was constructed. From 1980 to 1985 a 3-element interferometer was constructed, with another four antennas added between 1990 and 1992.

After the 85-foot dish was lost, another three antennas were added to the millimeter array for a total of 10 elements. This came to be known as BIMA.

The BIMA telescopes were moved in the spring of 2005 to be combined with other millimeter antennas as part of the Combined Array for Research in Millimeter-wave Astronomy (CARMA) project and to make way for the Allen Telescope Array (ATA).

Hat Creek Radio Astronomy Facilities

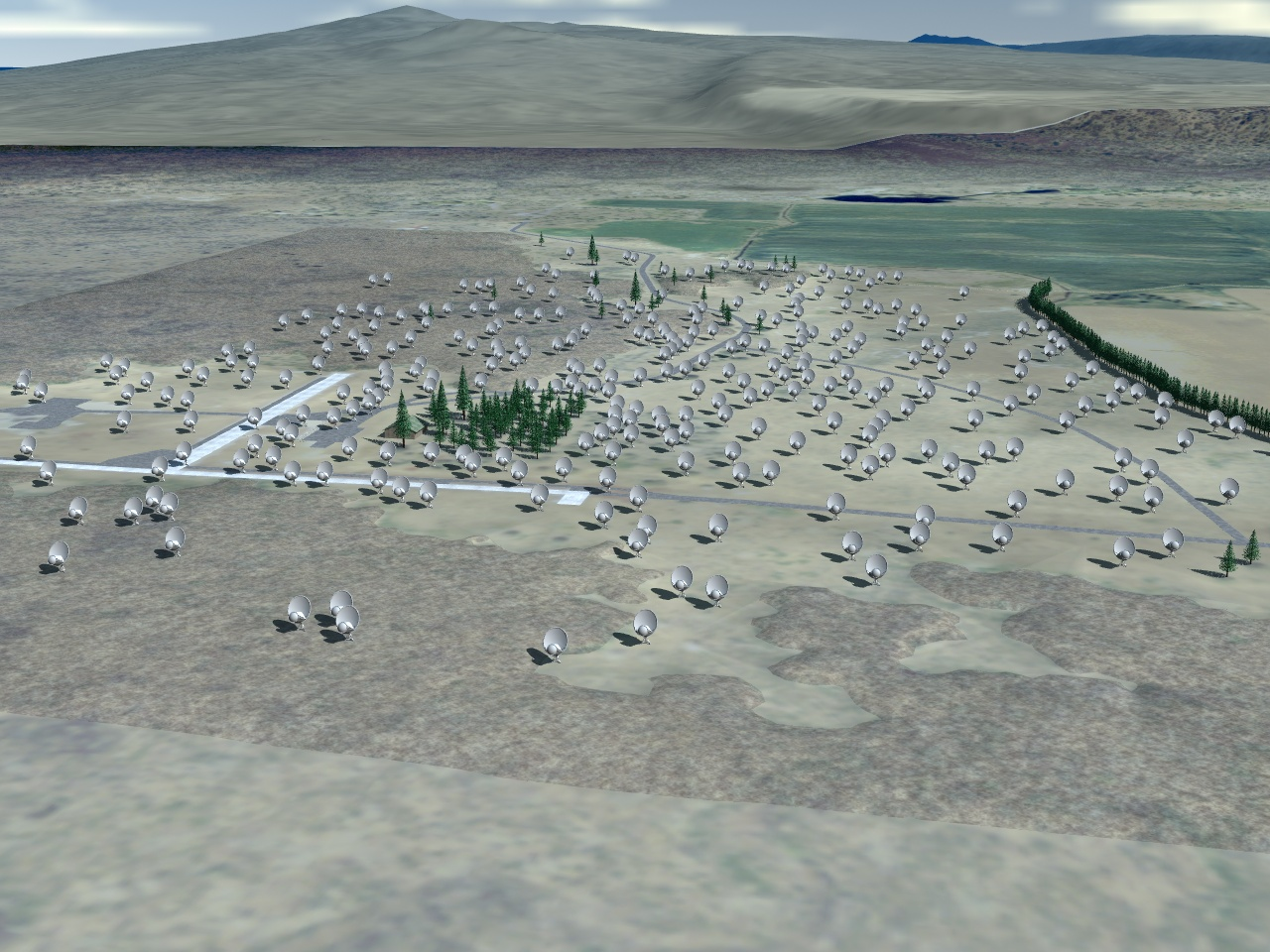
Artist Rendering of completed ATA-350

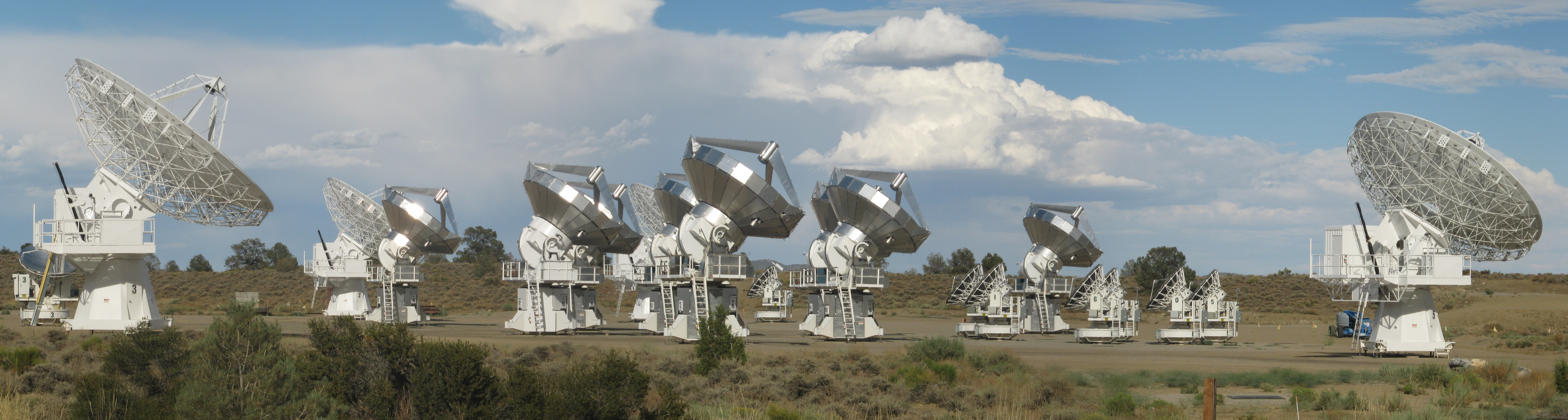
CARMA in D-array
