= Trumpler 27-1 =

Red supergiant star in the constellation Scorpius

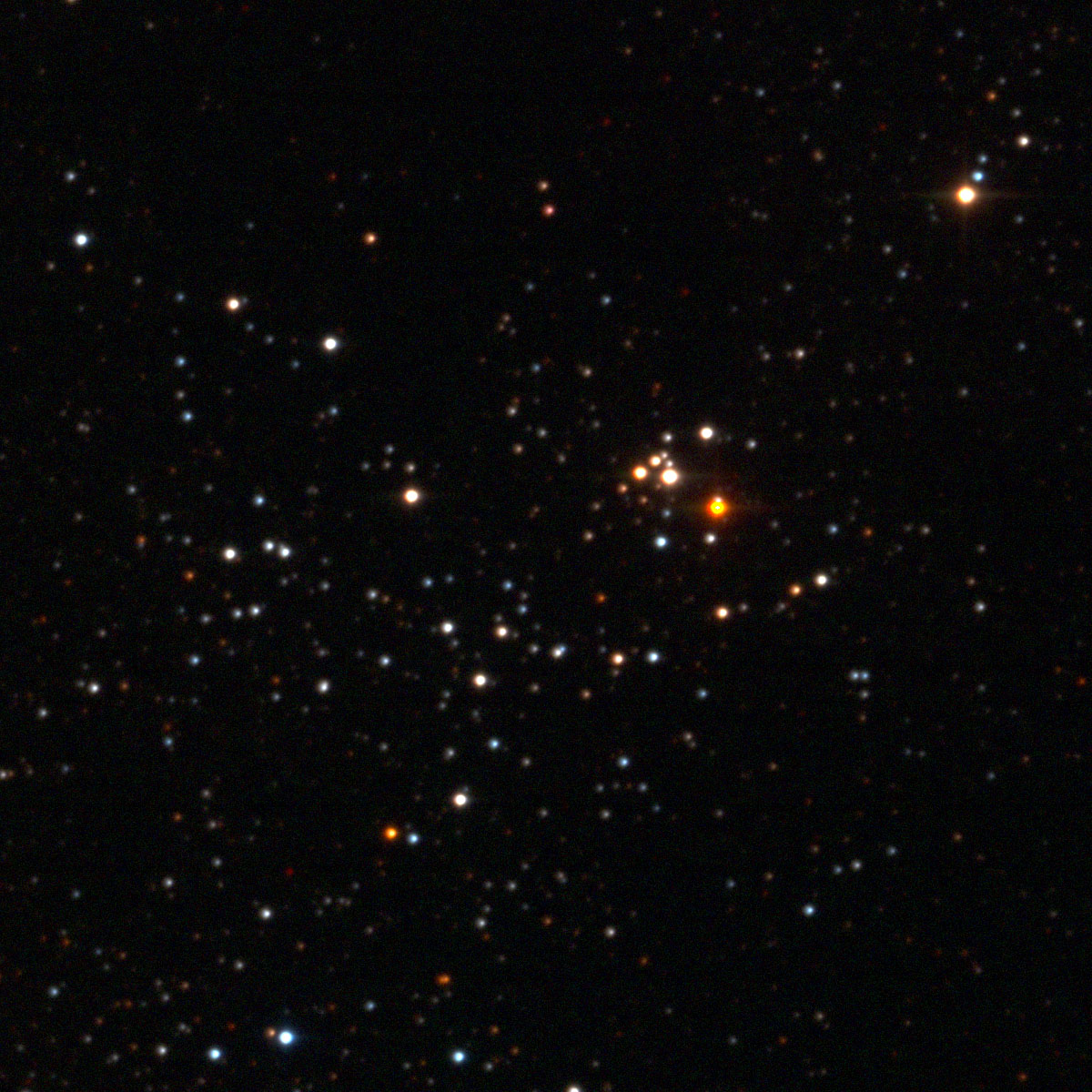
- The Trumpler 27 open cluster. Trumpler 27-1 is the brightest and reddest star in the image.

Observation data Epoch J2000 Equinox ICRS
- Constellation: Scorpius
- Right ascension: 17^{h} 36^{m} 10.1193^{s}
- Declination: −33° 29′ 40.617″
- Apparent magnitude (V): 8.79

Characteristics
- Evolutionary stage: Red supergiant
- Spectral type: M0Ia

Astrometry
Radial velocity (R_{v})	−18.71±0.9 km/s
Proper motion (μ)	RA: −0.057±0.049 mas/yr Dec.: −1.386±0.037 mas/yr
Parallax (π)	0.3169±0.0361 mas
Distance	approx. 10,000 ly (approx. 3,200 pc)

Details
Radius	1,359 R_{☉}
Luminosity	361,000 L_{☉}
Surface gravity (log g)	-0.24 cgs
Temperature	3,790 K
Metallicity [Fe/H]	+0.15 dex

Other designations
- CD−33 12241, CPD−33 4468, TYC 7380-627-1

Database references
SIMBAD	data

Trumpler 27-1 is a red supergiant star that is a member of the massive, possible open cluster Trumpler-27, where a blue giant star, a yellow supergiant star, and two Wolf–Rayet stars are also located.

== Observation history ==
Trumpler 27-1 was discovered and catalogued when the open cluster (not confirmed then) was first identified in the late 20th century. It has since remained largely unobserved, being featured in the Gaia Catalogue and other pieces of literature.

== Physical properties ==
Trumpler 27-1 is among the largest stars known, with a radius of over 1,360 solar radii. It is also 360,000 times more luminous than the Sun. This star's spectral type is M0Ia, meaning it possesses a cool temperature of below 3,800 K. So far, Trumpler 27-1 is the only identified red supergiant in the open cluster Trumpler 27.

If placed in the center of our Solar System, the radius of Trumpler 27-1 would lie beyond the orbit of Jupiter.

== Location ==
Trumpler 27–1, and the open cluster in which it is located, is in the constellation of Scorpius.

== See also ==
- Westerlund 1-26
- RSGC1
