= Charles Burckhalter =

American educator and amateur astronomer

- Born: January 5, 1849; Taylorsville, Ohio, U.S.
- Died: September 20, 1923 (aged 74); Oakland, California, U.S.
- Occupation: Teacher
- Spouse: Mary Catherine Nash
- Parent(s): Adam and Elisabeth Burckhalter

Charles Burckhalter (January 5, 1849 – September 20, 1923) was an American educator and amateur astronomer. He was the first director of the Chabot Observatory and a popular astronomy teacher.

== Biography ==
Burckhalter was born on January 5, 1849, in Taylorsville, Ohio. the son of Adam and Elisabeth Burckhalter. He graduated Ottumwa High School in 1866. In 1877 he moved to California and became an insurance adjuster in the San Francisco–Oakland region. The following year he was married to Mary Catherine Nash. They would have five children: Mary, Frank, Charles, Edward, and Robert. Burckhalter developed a strong interest in astronomy, and by 1880 he owned a 4-1/2 inch (11 cm) telescope. Three years later he had constructed his own 10-1/2 inch (27 cm) reflector. In 1885, Burckhalter was hired to teach geography and astronomy at the Oakland High School. He became director of the Chabot Observatory in 1887, which was located in central Oakland and owned by the City Board of Education.

Burckhalter organized and led an expedition of the Pacific Coast Amateur Photographic Association to photograph the Solar eclipse of January 1, 1889. The group gathered at Cloverdale, California with a total of 75 participants and thirty cameras. This assembly of amateur and professional astronomers led to the founding of the Astronomical Society of the Pacific (ASP). It was organized on February 7, 1889, with Burckhalter serving as one of the secretaries. He would later serve as president of this society, in 1895–96 and 1908–09, and would retain an active interest in the association for the remainder of his life.

He was elected a Fellow of the Royal Astronomical Society on February 12, 1892. Burckhalter joined the Lick Observatory eclipse expedition to observe the solar eclipse of August 9, 1896. He led the ASP expedition to India for the solar eclipse of January 22, 1898. He was also able to observe the solar eclipse of May 28, 1900 that crossed the eastern United States. In 1906 he was a member of the board of directors for the newly founded Seismological Society of America. He was able to relocate the Chabot Observatory to Leona Heights in east Oakland in 1915. Burckhalter managed to arrange for a 20-inch (51 cm) equatorial telescope to be added to the observatory.

Because of ill health, during May 1923 Burckhalter resigned from his post as head of the Department of Astronomy for the Oakland schools. He died on September 20, 1923, at his home in east Oakland. Earle G. Linsley from Mills College was chosen to be his successor as director of Chabot Observatory. At the age of 71, Burckhalter's wife died January 23, 1930, while still living in Oakland.

In 1924, the 20-inch telescope at Chabot Observatory was dedicated to the memory of Charles Burckhalter, with a plaque mounted on the telescope pier. The minor planet 3447 Burckhalter was named after him, as was the Charles Burckhalter elementary school, Burckhalter park, and Burckhalter avenue in Oakland.
