= Sunyaev–Zel'dovich Array =

Array of telescopes

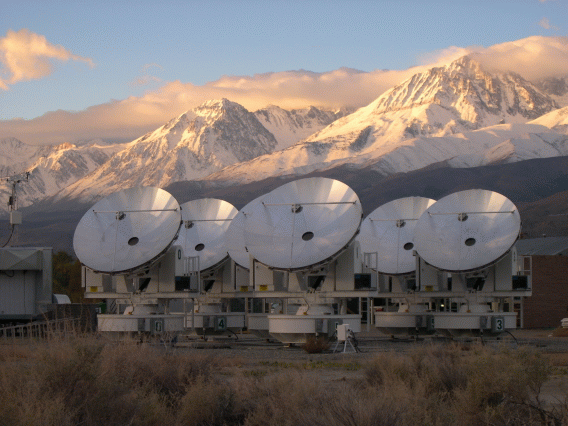
- The Sunyaev–Zel'dovich Array, taken during the Fall of 2005, Owens Valley Radio Observatory, eastern Sierra Nevada.
- Location(s): California, Pacific States Region
- Coordinates: 37°13′58″N 118°17′46″W
- Organization: Columbia University; Marshall Space Flight Center; Owens Valley Radio Observatory; University of Chicago
- Wavelength: 31, 100 GHz (9.7, 3.0 mm)
- Number of telescopes: 8
- Diameter: 3.5 m (11 ft 6 in)
- Website: astro.uchicago.edu/research/sza.php
- Location of Sunyaev–Zel'dovich Array
- Related media on Commons

The Sunyaev–Zeldovich Array (SZA) in California is an array of eight 3.5 meter telescopes that was operated as part of the now-closed Combined Array for Research in Millimeter-wave Astronomy (CARMA). Its initial goals were to survey the cosmic microwave background (CMB) in order to measure its fine-scale anisotropies and to find clusters of galaxies. The survey was completed in 2007, and the array is now used primarily to characterize clusters via the Sunyaev–Zeldovich effect. Observations commenced at the SZA in April 2005.

One of the most important developments of the last few years has been the detection, through observations of the CMB and supernova studies, of a form of energy that is accelerating the expansion of the universe. Dubbed dark energy by analogy with dark matter, it is believed to account for roughly 70% of the universe's energy content.

While dark energy cannot be observed directly, its basic properties can be inferred from its effect on structure formation in the universe. Just as an ecologist can learn about the food supply by studying how animal populations evolve with time, physicists can learn about dark energy by studying the population statistics of the universe's inhabitants—in this case, galaxy clusters.

The SZA gets its name from the means by which it measures galaxy clusters: the scattering of CMB light as it passes through the hot ionized cluster gas, known as the Sunyaev–Zeldovich effect (SZ effect). In short, the CMB is used as a backlight against which galaxy clusters can be seen by the shadows they cast. Since the SZA sees the shadow rather than the light emitted by the cluster itself, it can be used to measure sufficiently large clusters nearly independently of their redshift, back to the epoch at which clusters first began to form.

== Experiment ==
The SZA has been used for multi-wavelength observations of over 100 galaxy clusters, both on its own and as a part of the Combined Array for Research in Millimeter-wave Astronomy (CARMA), which was decommissioned after 3 April 2015. From 2005 to 2007, SZA undertook a deep 31 GHz (Gigahertz) survey of several patches of sky.

== Instrument ==
The SZA is not a single telescope, but an array of 8 telescopes operating together as an interferometer. An interferometer does not detect light in quite the same way as an ordinary telescope, by measuring the total power collected by a single dish; instead, it looks at differences between the light falling on pairs of telescopes. Like water waves, light waves can interfere with each other, producing a complex pattern of intensity enhancements where the waves constructively interfere, and nulls where they destructively interfere.

As light from a source washes over the array, an interferometer detects this interference pattern — hence the name. The source's structure on the sky can then be inferred from the interference pattern in much the same way that one might infer the size and shape of a stone thrown into a pond from the pattern of ripples left in its wake.

The native resolution of an interferometer depends not on the size of the individual telescopes (as with a traditional single telescope), but on their separation. Pairs of telescopes with large separations provide sensitivity to small-scale structure, while short spacings are sensitive to large-scale structure on the sky. The 8 SZA telescopes are small enough to be placed very close together, which provides maximum sensitivity to the (large-scale) SZ signal from clusters. When the SZA was combined with the other telescopes in the CARMA array, which had longer separations and were sensitive to finer angular scales, it formed a complete picture of galaxy clusters at very high resolution.
