= Berkeley-Illinois-Maryland Association =

Collaboration that built and operated a radio telescope array

Berkeley Illinois Maryland Array
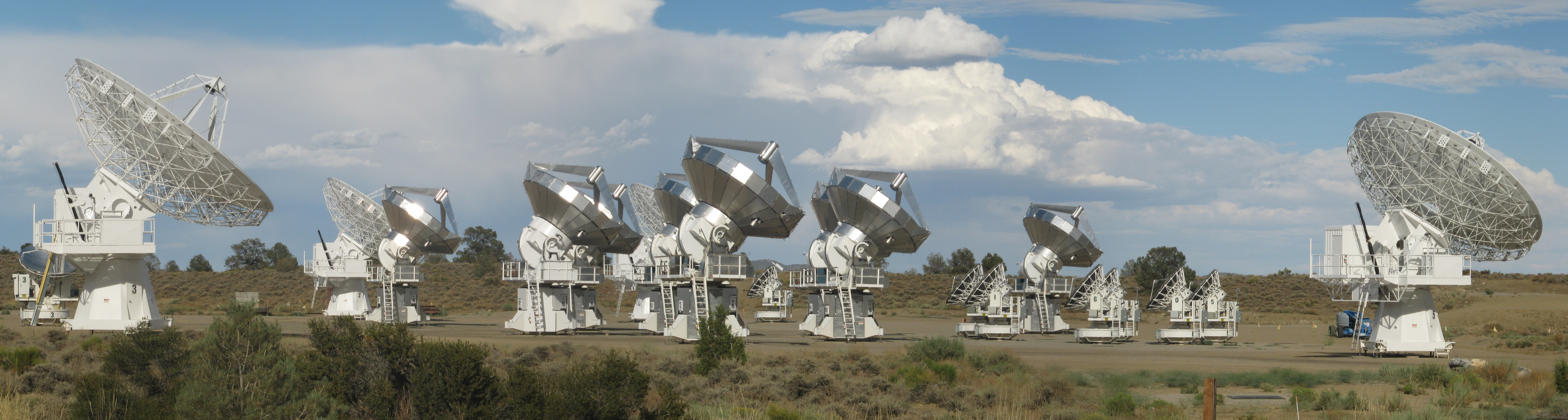
- Eight of the nine BIMA antennas (center) as incorporated into the Combined Array for Research in Millimeter-wave Astronomy (2009)
- Alternative names: Berkeley-Illinois-Maryland Association
- Location(s): United States
- Organization: University of California, Berkeley; University of Illinois Urbana-Champaign; University of Maryland
- Wavelength: 100 GHz (3.0 mm)
- Decommissioned: 2005
- Number of telescopes: 9
- Diameter: 6.1 m (20 ft 0 in)
- Website: bima.astro.umd.edu/bima/

The Berkeley-Illinois-Maryland Association (BIMA) was a collaboration of the Universities of California, Illinois, and Maryland that built and operated the eponymously named BIMA radio telescope array. Originally (1986) the premier imaging instrument in the world at millimeter wavelengths, the array was located at the UCB Hat Creek Observatory. In early 2005 nine of its ten antennas were moved to the Inyo Mountains and combined with antennas from the Caltech Owens Valley Radio Observatory and eight telescopes operating at a wavelength of 3.5 millimeters from the University of Chicago Sunyaev-Zel'dovich Array (SZA), to form CARMA, the largest millimeter array in the world for radio astronomy at the time. CARMA was in turn decommissioned in 2015.
