= Vert Dider =

Volunteer translation project

- Founded: July 1, 2013
- Type: Nonprofit organization
- Location: Saint Petersburg
- Key people: Roman Yakimov (project coordinator); Elena Smotrova (editor-in-chief); Alexey Malov (translator coordinator)
- Website: vertdider.com

Vert Dider is a non-profit volunteer project focused around translating and dubbing scientific and educational videos for Russian-speaking audience.

== History ==
The project was created in 2013 by Ilya Abilov, who voiced the first videos himself. In 2014, Abilov left the project, and leadership passed to Roman Yakimov. The studio is supported and developed by volunteers helping it evolve. The studio’s leading activity is translating and dubbing videos related to science. Over a thousand videos are currently available through the studio’s official public page on VK social media site. The list of translated into Russian and dubbed videos include videos from a number of educational YouTube channels, lectures, debates and documentaries.

On January 19, 2016, was the day when Vert Dider started cooperating with BuzzFeed media company.

In early 2017 Vert Dider started a YouTube channel for videos in English. That same year the studio joined efforts with the educational project SciOne to conduct interviews with Walter Lewin, Robert Sapolsky, Lawrence Krauss, Richard Dawkins and James Watson.

The studio has been a Harry Houdini Awards media partner since the Russian analogue to James Randi’s One Million Dollar Paranormal Challenge was founded.

=== Lectures ===
In October 2015, the studio started translating Richard Feynman’s Messenger Lectures into Russian. By July, 2017 the whole series had been translated and dubbed, and is currently publicly available for Russian-speakers.

In July 2016, the studio started translating and dubbing the CS50 Harvard course for JavaRush. In April 2017, an announcement was made that the work had been completed.

As of April, 2018, translation of Human Behavioral Biology by Robert Sapolsky is in progress (the fourteenth lecture of the course with Russian translation was published in February, 2018). The studio took on the task of spreading word about Robert Sapolsky throughout Russian-speaking audience. In 2017, the studio managed to arrange a long interview with Prof. Sapolsky. With the studio’s information support, “A Primate's Memoir” by Sapolsky was published by “Alpina non-fiction” publishing house.

=== Cooperation with educational channels ===
The studio was allowed by a number of creators behind major educational channels to translate and dub their videos. The channels are listed below:

- Veritasium (since 2015)
- AsapScience (since 2015)
- MinutePhysics (since 2015)
- Fraser Cain (since 2017)

== Awards ==
In 2015, the studio was nominated as “The best online project about science” for an award "For Loyalty to Science" initiated by Ministry of Education and Science of the Russian Federation.

== See also ==
- Geek Picnic
