= Andrew Fraknoi =

Astronomer

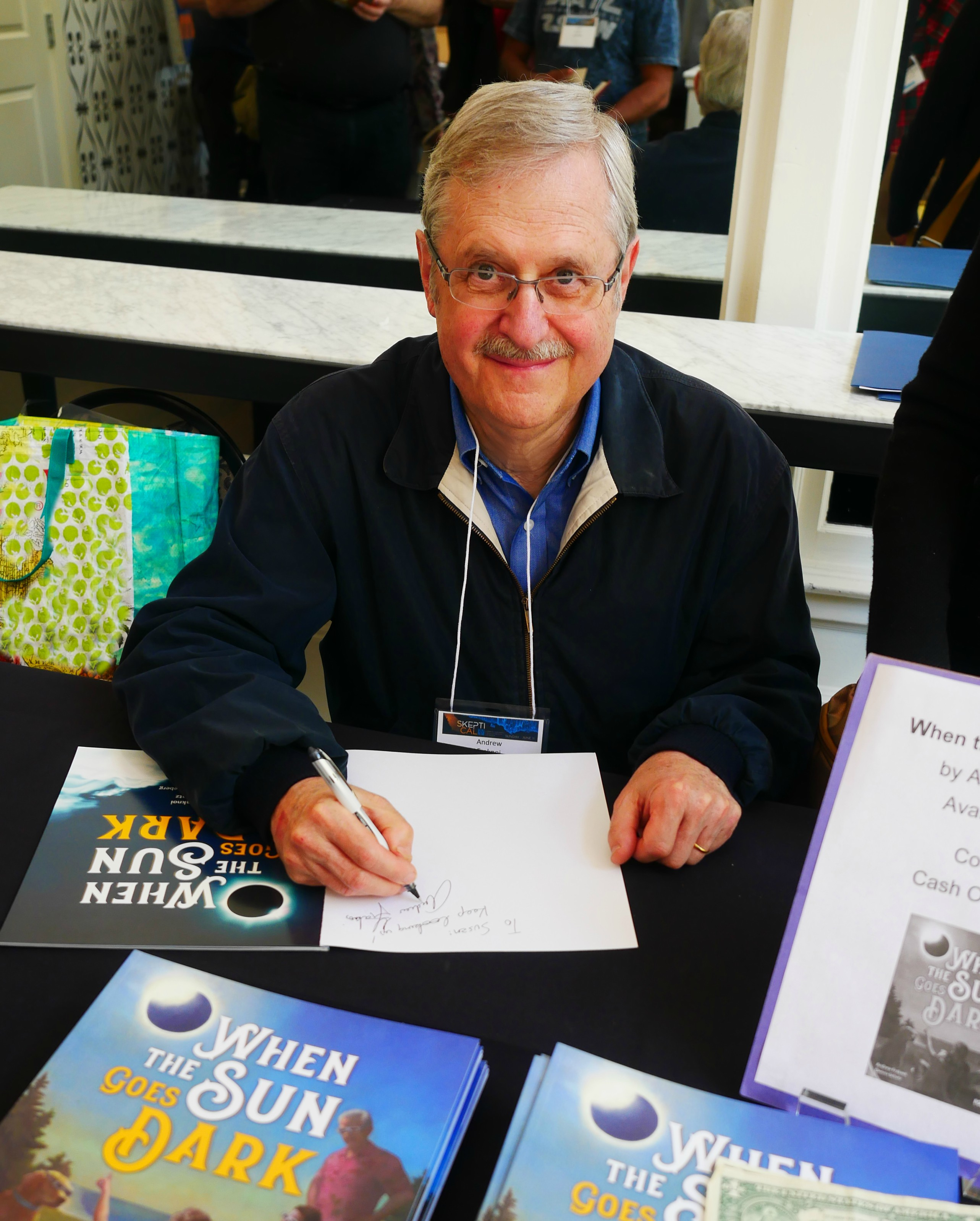
- Fraknoi signing books at the 2017 SkeptiCal Conference Berkeley, CA
- Born: 1948 (age 77–78); Hungarian Republic
- Education: Harvard College; University of California, Berkeley
- Awards: 2007 California Professor of the Year; 2007 Richard H. Emmons Award; 2007 Gemant Prize; 1994 Annenberg Foundation Award; 1994 Klumpke-Roberts Award; 2011 Elected Honorary Member, Royal Astronomical Society of Canada; 2013 Faraday Science Communicator Award; 2019 Lifetime Achievement Award in Space Education, National Science Club
- Scientific career
- Fields: Astronomy, astronomy popularization, science communication
- Workplaces: Foothill College; Astronomical Society of the Pacific

Andrew Fraknoi (born 1948) is a Hungarian-born American retired professor of astronomy recognized for his lifetime of work using everyday language to make astronomy more accessible and popular for both students and the general public. In 2017 Fraknoi retired from his position as Chair of the Department of Astronomy at Foothill College. In retirement he continues to teach through the Fromm Institute for Lifelong Learning and the Osher Lifelong Learning Institute at San Francisco State University, to give public lectures, and to add to his body of written work. He is the recipient of numerous awards and honors in his field.

Fraknoi continues to serve on the Board of Directors of the Search for Extraterrestrial Intelligence (SETI) Institute, a scientific and educational organization. He is also an elected Fellow of the California Academy of Sciences, an Honorary Member of the Royal Astronomical Society of Canada, and a Fellow of the Committee for Skeptical Inquiry. He has a special interest in debunking astrology and other pseudosciences connected to astronomy.

== Early life and education ==
Fraknoi was born in Hungary in 1948. Eight years later, following the Hungarian Revolution of 1956, he and his family fled their home in Budapest. They spent almost a year in an Austrian refugee camp and finally resettled in New York City. He entered his first American school at age 11, unable to speak English. Comic books, with their pictures and simple language, became his preferred entry point to learning. His initial interest was superhero comic books, and then comics with outer space themes. "This isn't just comic books – this is real," he recalls thinking about space.

Fraknoi graduated from the Bronx High School of Science in 1966. He earned his A.B. in Astronomy (with a minor in Physics) from Harvard University in 1970, and his M.A. in Astronomy from University of California, Berkeley in 1972.

== Professional career ==
Fraknoi held the position of Chair of the Department of Astronomy at Foothill College from 1992 to 2017. He also taught astronomy and physics at other institutions including San Francisco State University, City College of San Francisco, Cañada College, and several campuses of the University of California Extension Division. Fraknoi served as the executive director of the Astronomical Society of the Pacific from 1978 to 1992, edited its popular magazine "Mercury", both expanding circulation and reaching out to lay people as well as teachers. In this role he also established the newsletter "The Universe in the Classroom" specifically for teachers. He is the founder and was director of "Project ASTRO", which sets up partnerships between volunteer astronomers and 4th-9th grade teachers; each astronomer "adopts" one classroom for a year, visits at least four times, and works with the teacher to do hands-on activities in astronomy. The program is still operating in sites around the country. Later he founded and directed "Family ASTRO", a project to design activities, kits and games to help families share the excitement of astronomical discovery.

Fraknoi is recognized for both his multi-dimensional approach, and his innovation, in making astronomy more accessible to all. His popular interdisciplinary course on Albert Einstein's life and work, Physics for Poets (nicknamed "Einstein Without Tears"), won the 2005 "Innovation of the Year" award from the League for Innovation. In this course students learn about areas of modern physics that Einstein had a role in creating or changing, and then read novels, stories, and poems, and hear music influenced by Einstein's work and ideas. According to Thuy Thi Nguyen, president of Foothill College at the time of Fraknoi's retirement, the college sent a memo to the student body to warn them that spring semester 2017 would be their last chance to attend this very popular course. Fraknoi also created and offered various other courses for non-science majors.

In 2007 Fraknoi was the narrator for Gustav Holst's "The Planets" for the California Symphony Orchestra, a role he repeated with the Peninsula Symphony in 2017. He holds a long-time interest in astronomically correct science fiction, which he also uses in his teaching and writing. He has compiled an extensive resource with examples of scientifically accurate science fiction. He also is a science fiction author in his own right with twelve published stories: for example, two in the magazine Sci Phi Journal, one in the online magazine Flash Fiction, and two in science fiction anthologies.

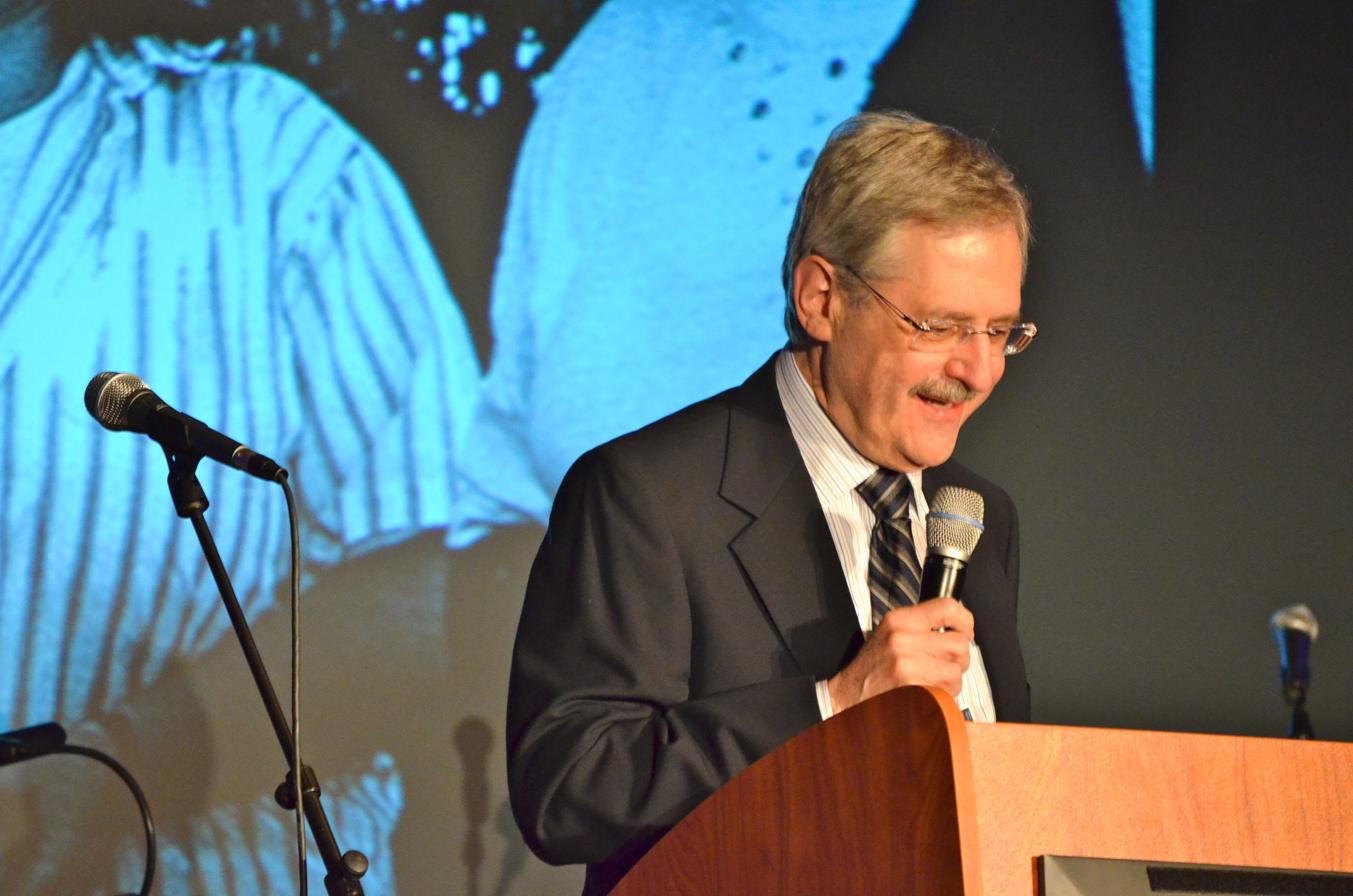
Fraknoi hosting Silicon Valley Lecture Series 2017

Since 1999, Fraknoi has organized and moderated the Silicon Valley Astronomy Lecture Series where noted astronomers from around California and the nation give nontechnical public talks on new developments in our exploration of the universe in the large Smithwick Theater at Foothill College. Cosponsored by the SETI Institute, and the Astronomical Society of the Pacific, the talks, attended by 400 to 900+ people each time, have featured Nobel laureates, members of the National Academy of Sciences, and many other distinguished scientists. Many lectures have been taped and are available on YouTube where the series has over 4 million views.

Fraknoi has served on the Board of Directors of the SETI Institute, a scientific and educational organization devoted to the search for life in the universe, since its inception in 1985. From 2010 to 2012, he was vice-chair of the Board and served on the program committee planning the first and second SETIcon, a national weekend public conferences devoted to the scientific quest for our counterparts among the stars. In 2013, he was elected to the board of trustees of the Friends of the Lick Observatory, later called the Lick Observatory Council.

In his retirement Fraknoi continues to teach classes at both the Fromm Institute for Lifelong Learning through University of San Francisco, and the Osher Lifelong Learning Institute at San Francisco State University.

== Written works ==
Fraknoi is the author or co-author of 14 books in the field of astronomy. He was the lead author of Voyages through the Universe, an introductory college astronomy textbook published by Brooks-Cole, which went through three editions. In the 1980s, he co-edited with Byron Preiss two collections of science articles and science fiction stories, "The Universe" and "The Planets." With Sidney Wolff, Fraknoi founded and was co-editor of the first on-line journal devoted to astronomy education, "Astronomy Education Review". He edited two collections of resources for K-12 teachers, The Universe at Your Fingertips and More Universe at Your Fingertips published through the Astronomical Society of the Pacific. Additionally, he is the lead author of the 2016 college textbook "Astronomy", published by OpenStax as a free book for college students around the world, part of a project at Rice University (supported by the Bill and Melinda Gates Foundation and the William and Flora Hewlett Foundation) to make college more affordable.

He also authored multiple resources for young people. He is the co-author of the richly illustrated 2017 children's book about eclipses "When the Sun Goes Dark", that came out just ahead of the North American solar eclipse in August 2017. In 2007, his first children's book "Wonderful World of Space" was published by Disney. When asked about the book in a 2008 podcast interview, Fraknoi explained, "This has been a fun project. My son, who was 13 at the time, and I got a chance to write a picture book on astronomy for Disney and the challenge was how can we convey some of these modern ideas, including the Big Bang, to kids who are in 4th or 5th grade." His 2015 book, "Solar Science", published by the National Science Teachers Association, is full of 45 hands-on activities about the Sun, the seasons, the Moon, eclipses, and more.

Fraknoi frequently writes articles on interdisciplinary topics, such as using music, poetry, or science fiction to teach science. He has published a list of science fiction stories using good astronomy, as well as a resource guide to music inspired by astronomy. Fraknoi himself has had twelve science-fiction stories published. two of them in anthologies. The story "Cave in Arsia Mons" is in the book "Building Red: Mission Mars," edited by Janet Cannon, and the story "Supernova Rhythm" is published in the book "Science Fiction by Scientists," edited by Mike Brotherton and published by Springer. Two of his stories appeared in Sci Phi Journal, while others can be found on-line in Flash Fiction, Wyldblood, The Worlds Within, and Theme of Absence magazines; see External Links below. In 2025 he published a science fiction story about the rarity of total eclipses, entitled Eclipsed. and another in 2026 about the far future of the universe, Elegy.

== Media appearances ==
Fraknoi has been a frequent radio, television and podcast guest explaining astronomical developments in everyday language. According to his published biography at Wonderfest, the science education organization that awarded him their 2002 Carl Sagan Prize for Science Popularization, Fraknoi "appeared for over 20 years on the Jim Eason Show on KGO or KSFO radio and [as] a regular guest on both the Pete Wilson Show (later the "Gil Gross Show") on KGO and Michael Krasny's Forum program on KQED. Nationally, he has been heard regularly on Science Friday and Weekend All Things Considered on National Public Radio. He has given over 400 public lectures on topics ranging from the death of stars to the origin of the universe." His television appearances include The Today Show, CBS Morning News, and Larry King Live. He also posts frequently on his own blog Exploring the Universe.

== Awards and recognition ==
Fraknoi has been the recipient of many notable awards throughout his career. In 1994 he was awarded the American Astronomical Society's Annenberg Foundation Award -- then the highest honor in the field of astronomy education, as well as the Klumpke-Roberts Award of The Astronomical Society of the Pacific (given for a lifetime of contributions to popularizing astronomy). In 2002 he received the Carl Sagan Prize for Science Popularization. In 2007 he was named California Professor of the Year by the Carnegie Foundation for the Advancement of Teaching and the Council for Advancement and Support of Education. Additionally he was conferred the Astronomical Society of the Pacific's 2007 Richard H. Emmons award and the American Institute of Physics' 2007 Andrew Gemant Award (given for a lifetime of contributions to the intersection of physics and culture). In 2011 he was elected an Honorary Member by the Royal Astronomical Society of Canada and in 2013 was conferred the Faraday Science Communicator Award. Asteroid 4859 was named Asteroid Fraknoi by the International Astronomical Union "to honor his work in sharing the excitement of modern astronomy with students, teachers and the public".

In March 2019, Fraknoi was awarded the 2019 Space Educator: Lifetime Achievement Award from The National Space Club, a prestigious award that recognizes people for significant contributions to space-science education. He was presented with the award at the 62nd Annual Goddard Memorial Dinner on March 22, 2019.

He was elected a Legacy Fellow of the American Astronomical Society in 2020.

== Personal philosophy ==
Fraknoi has demonstrated, through a lifetime of work, his commitment to advancing public understanding of astronomy and science using everyday language. He said in an interview after being named 2007 California Professor of the Year: "I believe that an understanding of our place in the wider universe and the methods of science are part of the birthright of everyone living on our planet.... Yet, the way science is taught in this country can often discourage non-science majors from taking a life-long interest, or even a course-long interest, in science. My philosophy is to show students that science is engaging, human, and part of our cultural heritage." In 2013 Fraknoi received the Faraday Science Communicator Award. Michael Faraday, for whom the award was named, was an influential 19th century scientist and a great advocate for rigorous, skeptical thinking and recognizing how easy it is for the mind to deceive itself. Fraknoi was quoted on receipt of the award, "I too try to encourage students and the public to examine claims at the fringes of science with skepticism and fact-based thinking".

== Personal life ==
Fraknoi and his wife live in San Francisco. They have one son.

== Works ==
- Fraknoi, Andrew; Morrison, David; Wolff, Sidney (March 9, 2022). Astronomy. Houston, Texas: OpenStax and 12th Media Services. ISBN 9781680920383.
- Fraknoi, Andrew; Morrison, David; Wolff, Sidney (March 11, 2005). Voyages Through the Universe (3 ed.). Belmont, CA: Brooks Cole. ISBN 978-0495017899.
- Fraknoi, Andrew; Schatz, Dennis (2017). When the Sun Goes Dark. National Science Teachers Association. ISBN 978-1-68140-011-2.
- Schatz, Dennis; Fraknoi, Andrew (2015). Solar Science: Exploring Sunspots, Seasons, Eclipses, and More. National Science Teachers Association Press. ISBN 978-1-941316-07-8.
- Fraknoi, Andrew (3 July 2007). Space. Disney Press. ISBN 978-0-7868-4969-7.
- Fraknoi, Andrew (2007). Wonderful World of Space. Disney Learning.
- Fraknoi, Andrew (1985). Universe in the classroom : a resource guide for teaching astronomy and instructor's manual for Universe by William J. Kaufmann, III. New York: W.H. Freeman. ISBN 978-0716716921.
- Some articles on the web by Fraknoi
- Fraknoi's 2019 humorous science fiction story on a message from an extra-terrestrial civilization
- Fraknoi's 2021 short science fiction story 'I Swallowed a Martian'
- Fraknoi's 2022 short science fiction story 'Slow-time Station'
- Fraknoi's short science fiction story 'No One Bet on Canis Major'
- Fraknoi's 2025 short science fiction story 'The Lurker'
- Fraknoi's 2026 short science fiction story 'Who Speaks for Earth'
- Fraknoi's catalog of over 250 pieces of music inspired by astronomy
- Fraknoi's annotated subject index of science fiction stories with good astronomy
