= VZ Piscium =

Variable star in the constellation Pisces

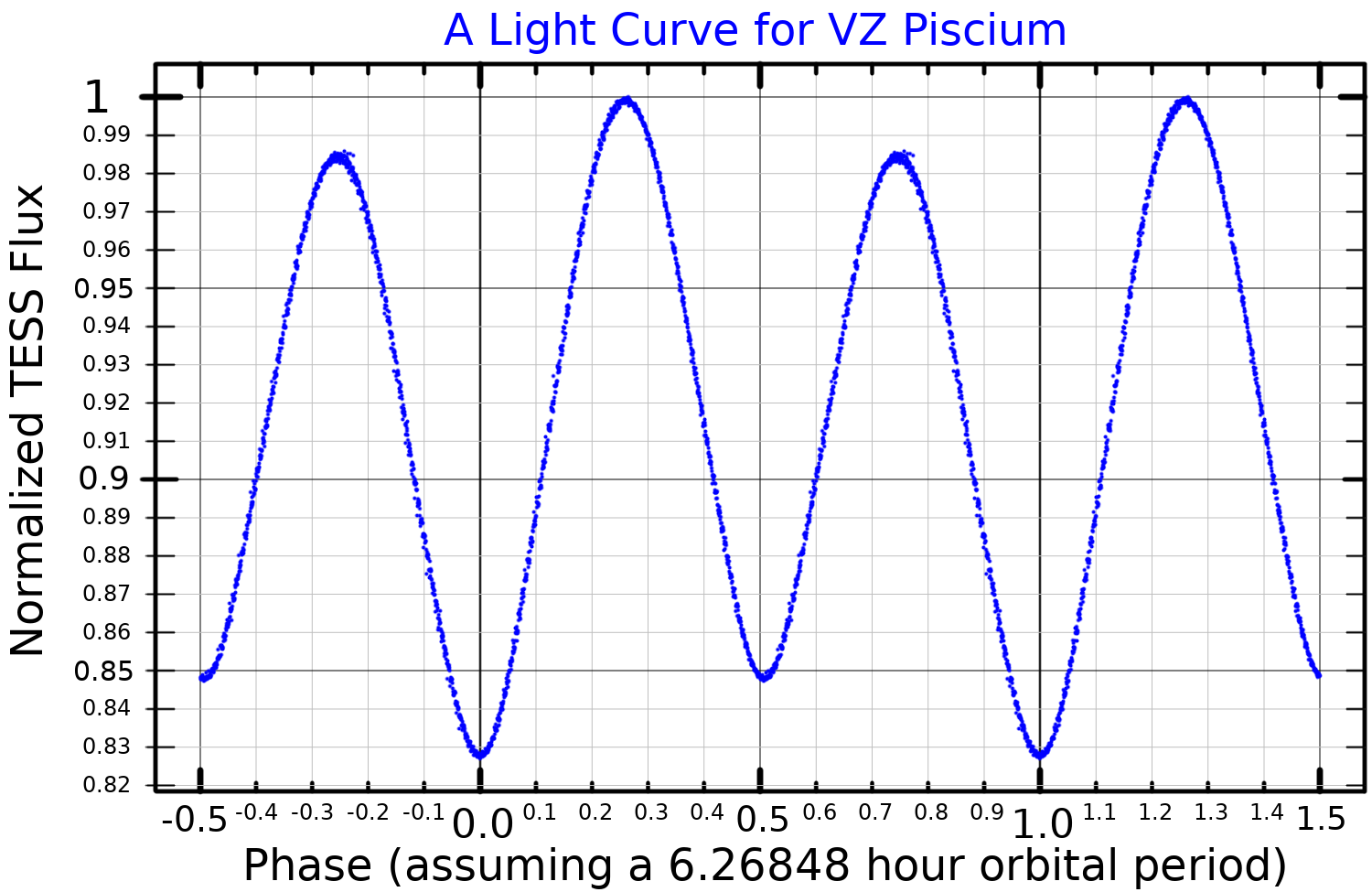
- A light curve for VZ Piscium plotted from TESS data

Observation data Epoch J2000 Equinox ICRS
- Constellation: Pisces
- Right ascension: 23^{h} 27^{m} 48.388^{s}
- Declination: +04° 51′ 23.94″
- Apparent magnitude (V): 10.20 – 10.45

Characteristics
- Evolutionary stage: Main sequence
- Spectral type: K2 + K5 + M9
- B−V color index: 1.15
- Variable type: Contact-type W UMa

Astrometry
Radial velocity (R_{v})	−4.3±1.8 km/s
Proper motion (μ)	RA: +437.182 mas/yr Dec.: +177.857 mas/yr
Parallax (π)	18.3420±0.0166 mas
Distance	177.8 ± 0.2 ly (54.52 ± 0.05 pc)
Absolute magnitude (M_{V})	6.51

Orbit
Period (P)	0.26125921 d
Semi-major axis (a)	1.897763 R_{☉}
Inclination (i)	56.3±0.2°

Details

Primary
Mass	0.742 M_{☉}
Radius	0.798 R_{☉}
Temperature	4,908±8 K

Secondary
Mass	0.5998 M_{☉}
Radius	0.648 R_{☉}
Temperature	4,011±42 K

Tertiary
Mass	87.41±9.54 M_{Jup}
Radius	1.06±0.04 R_{Jup}
Luminosity	3.802+0.272 −0.254×10^{−4} L_{☉}
Surface gravity (log g)	5.31±0.08 cgs
Temperature	2,468±50 K

Other designations
- VZ Psc, BD+04°5012, HIP 115819, SAO 109778, G 29-37, LTT 16900

Database references
SIMBAD	data

VZ Piscium is a triple star system in the equatorial constellation of Pisces. it is located at a distance of 178 light years (54.5 parsecs) from the Sun based on parallax measurements, and has an apparent visual magnitude of about 10.3. This is an eclipsing binary system that undergoes shallow eclipses; the brightness decreases to magnitude 10.45 during the primary eclipse, then to magnitude 10.43 with the secondary eclipse, although as a contact binary the brightness varies continuously with no period of constant maximum brightness. The system is drifting closer with a radial velocity of approximately −4 km/s, and has a net heliocentric velocity of 144.1 km/s.

S. C. Wolff and associates examined the spectrum of this star in 1965 and found very weak H and K lines with an emission component. Some of the lines are doubled, which suggested this is a contact binary. It was confirmed as a W Ursae Majoris (W UMa) variable using photometric observations made by J. Moorhead. O. J. Eggen in 1967 found a period of just 6.26 hours and a high tangential space velocity of at least 100 km/s. Most of the variability of the system was found to be ellipsoidal and a small O'Connell effect was detected. The combined stellar class of the system matches a K-type main-sequence star with a type of about K3. A mass ratio close to one indicates the two stars have similar mass.

Due to physical contact, most W UMa-type variables show eclipse minima of almost equal depth, but that is not the case for VZ Psc. The H and K line emission for this system suggests surface magnetic activity, and thus star spots. These darker features may explain the varying light curve of the system. A variation in the orbital period of the system has been observed over a time frame of 25 years, which may be explained by a magnetic activity cycle of the lower mass component. There is a temperature difference of about 900 K between the two components, which remains unexplained as direct contact would tend to even out the temperature. Both stars are highly distorted by the gravity of the other star. The more massive star is a third larger in the direction of the companion than pole-to-pole, and the less massive star is even more distorted.

The outer (tertiary) companion, named HIP 115819 B, was detected as a member of this system in 2014 using data from the Pan-STARRS. It is located at a projected separation of 1,825+180
−390 AU from the inner pair. It is a very low-mass star with 7.9–8.5% the mass of the Sun and a spectral type M9. This star has a cool effective temperature of 2,468±50 K and 1.06 times the radius of Jupiter (~0.11 times the radius of the Sun).
