= Jill Tarter =

American astronomer

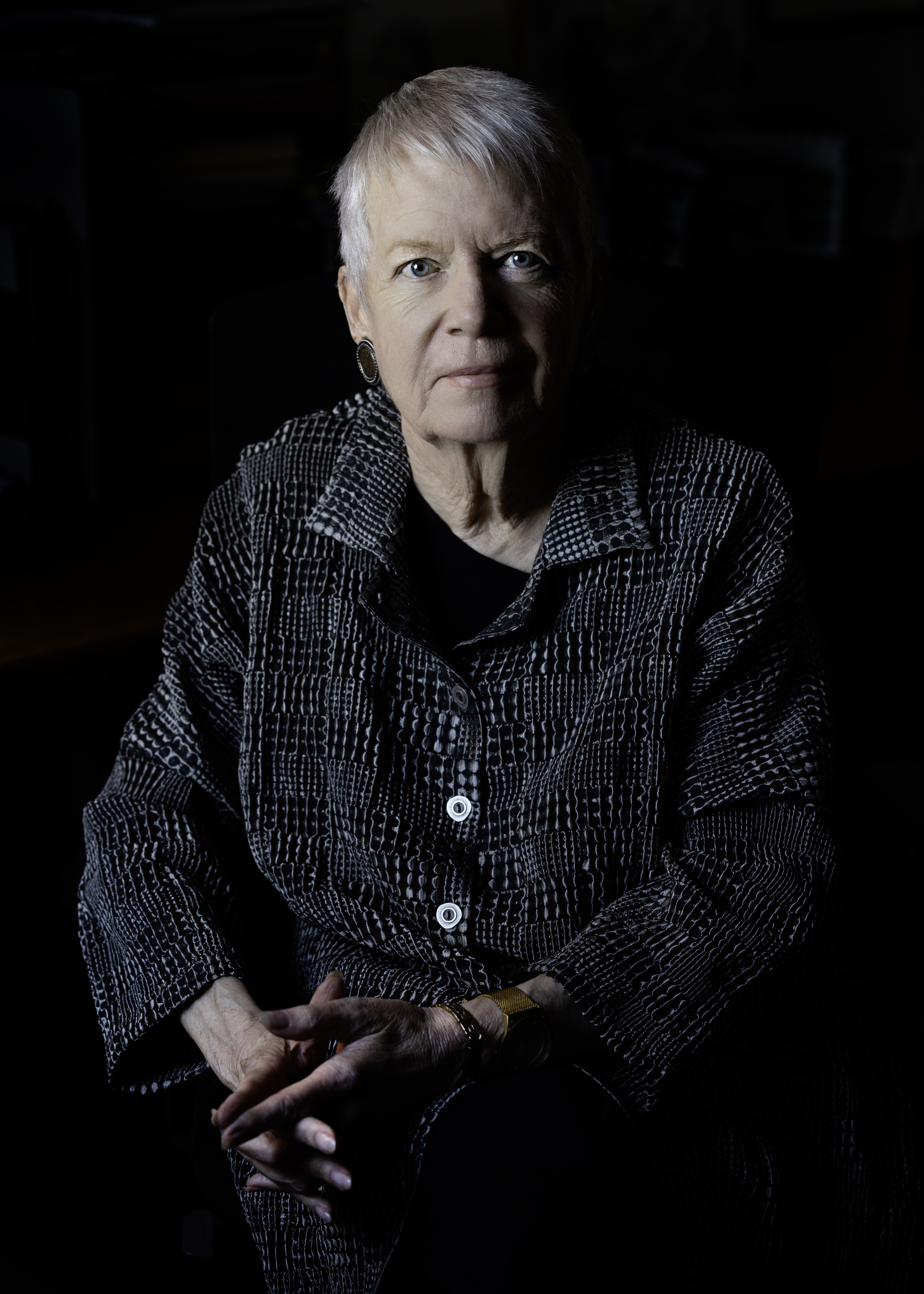
- Tarter at her home in 2025
- Born: Jill Cornell; January 16, 1944 (age 82)
- Education: Cornell University (BS); University of California, Berkeley (MS, PhD)
- Known for: SETI research
- Spouse(s): C. Bruce Tarter; Jack Welch
- Children: 1 daughter with Bruce Tarter, and 3 step-children with Jack Welch
- Scientific career
- Fields: Radio astronomy
- Thesis: The Interaction of Gas and Galaxies within Galaxy Clusters (1975)
- Doctoral advisor: Joseph Silk
- Website: www.seti.org/our-scientists/jill-tarter

Jill Cornell Tarter (born January 16, 1944) is an American astronomer who works on the search for extraterrestrial intelligence (SETI). Tarter is the former director of the Center for SETI Research, holding the Bernard M. Oliver Chair for SETI at the SETI Institute. In 2002, Discover magazine recognized her as one of the 50 most important women in science.

== Early life and education ==
Tarter grew up in New York State, and graduated from Eastchester High School in 1961. She was elected to its alumni association hall of fame in 2001. Prior to his death when she was twelve years old, Tarter's father was an early inspiration who encouraged her curiosity when she resisted suggestions that she follow pursuits considered more appropriate for a girl and announced that she wanted to be an engineer. On family trips to Florida with her father, she would look up at the dark skies and wonder who or what might be out there.

Tarter earned a Bachelor of Engineering Physics degree as an undergraduate at Cornell University (1965) as the only woman in her graduating class of 300 in the engineering college. Her professional interest in astronomy emerged as she pursued a Master's degree (1971) and PhD (1975) at the University of California at Berkeley. In her PhD dissertation, she coined the term "brown dwarf" while researching small-mass objects that fail to stably fuse hydrogen.

== Astronomy career ==
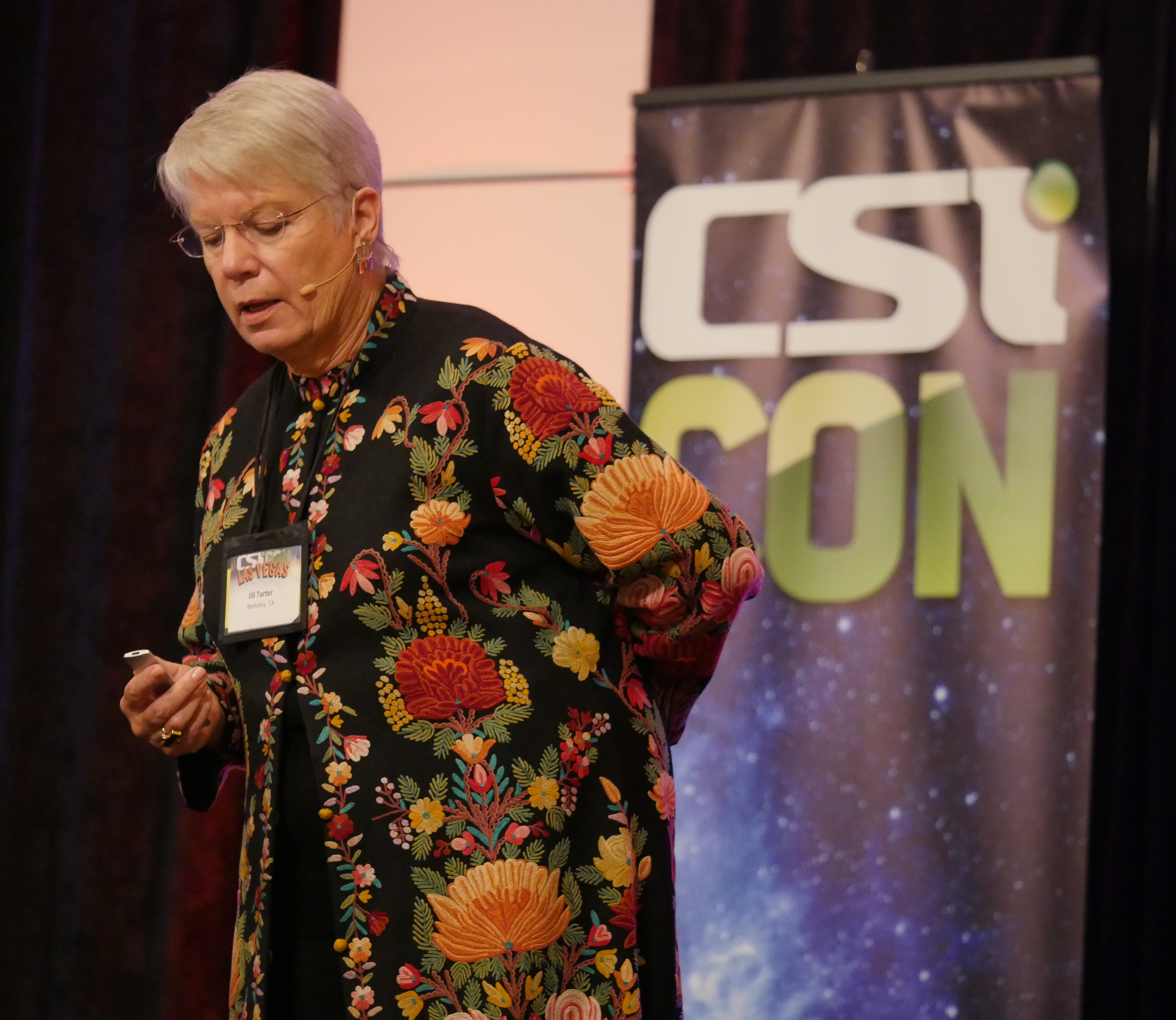
"Life Beyond Earth" CSICon 2016

Tarter has worked on a number of major scientific projects, most relating to the search for extraterrestrial life. As a graduate student, she was inspired to do SETI research by the Cyclops Report. Stuart Bowyer gave her the report to read when Bowyer discovered that Tarter could program the then-outdated PDP-8/S computer that had been donated by Jack Welch for Bowyer's SETI project at Hat Creek Radio Observatory. She worked with Bowyer on the radio-search project SERENDIP and created the corresponding backronym, "Search for Extraterrestrial Radio Emissions from Nearby Developed Intelligent Populations". She was project scientist for NASA's High Resolution Microwave Survey (HRMS) in 1992 and 1993 and subsequently director of Project Phoenix (HRMS reconfigured) under the auspices of the SETI Institute. She was co-creator with Margaret Turnbull of the HabCat in 2002, a principal component of Project Phoenix. Tarter has published dozens of technical papers and lectures extensively both on the search for extraterrestrial intelligence and the need for proper science education. She had spent 35 years in the quest for extraterrestrial life when she announced her retirement in 2012.

On October 20, 2006, Tarter appeared on the Point of Inquiry podcast to discuss the question: "Are we alone?" Tarter stated, "Humans will have a different view about being human if and when we know the answer to the 'Are we alone?' question."

In 2011, Tarter delivered a talk, "Intelligent Life in the Universe: Is Anybody Out There?", at the first Starmus Festival in the Canary Islands. The festival, founded by astronomer Garik Israelian, was a blend of astronomy, allied sciences, music, and art. Tarter subsequently joined the Starmus Board of Directors, along with Israelian, astrophysicist and Queen founding guitarist Brian May, theoretical physicist Stephen Hawking, evolutionary biologist Richard Dawkins, and others. Her 2011 talk was published in the book Starmus: 50 Years of Man in Space. Tarter is a member of the CuriosityStream Advisory Board and the Space for Humanity Board of Advisors.

In May 2013, the Science Laureates of the United States Act of 2013 was introduced into Congress. Tarter was listed by one commentator as a possible nominee for the position of Science Laureate, if the act were to pass.

In 2017, science journalist Sarah Scoles published a biography of Tarter and a history of SETI, called Making Contact: Jill Tarter and the Search for Extraterrestrial Intelligence.

== Honors and awards ==
Tarter's work in astrobiology and her success as a female scientist have garnered achievement awards from a number of scientific organizations.

- Awarded a Lifetime Achievement Award by Women in Aerospace in 1989.
- Elected a Fellow of the Committee for Skeptical Inquiry in 1994.
- Chabot Observatory named her their person of the year in 1997.
- Was awarded the Telluride Tech Festival Award of Technology in 2001.
- Was elected a Fellow of the American Association for the Advancement of Science in 2002 and a Fellow of the California Academy of Sciences in 2003.
- Received the Adler Planetarium Women in Space Science Award in 2003.
- Was named one of the 100 most influential people in the world by Time Magazine in 2004.
- Received two public service medals from NASA.
- Asteroid 74824 Tarter (1999 TJ16) was named and approved by the International Astronomical Union’s Small Bodies Naming Committee in 2005.
- Received Wonderfest's Carl Sagan Prize for Science Popularization in 2005.
- Recipient of a 2009 TED Prize.
- Elected a Legacy Fellow of the American Astronomical Society in 2020.
- Elected a member of the American Academy of Arts and Sciences in 2021.

== Popular culture ==
Tarter's astronomical work is illustrated in Carl Sagan's novel Contact. In the film version of Contact, the protagonist Ellie Arroway is played by Jodie Foster. Tarter conversed with the actress for months before and during filming, and Arroway was "largely based" on Tarter's work. She has also been featured in John Boswell's Symphony of Science music video, "The Poetry of Reality (An Anthem for Science)".

Prior to Seticon II in 2012 Tarter addressed concerns about alien invasion, like those seen in science fiction films, in particular those expressed by Stephen Hawking. Correlated with Hawking's reservations is his belief that humans should not attempt to broadcast signals in order to contact alien civilizations (Active SETI). Tarter believes that aliens evolved enough to communicate with and travel to Earth will be long-lived enough to have needed to grow beyond violent tendencies.

"Often the aliens of science fiction say more about us than they do about themselves.... While Sir [sic] Stephen Hawking warned that alien life might try to conquer or colonize Earth, I respectfully disagree. If aliens were able to visit Earth that would mean they would have technological capabilities sophisticated enough not to need slaves, food, or other planets. If aliens were to come here it would be simply to explore. Considering the age of the Universe, we probably wouldn't be their first extraterrestrial encounter, either. We should look at movies like 'Men in Black III,' 'Prometheus' and 'Battleship' as great entertainment and metaphors for our own fears, but we should not consider them harbingers of alien visitation."
