= Keith Devlin =

British mathematician (born 1947)

Keith J. Devlin
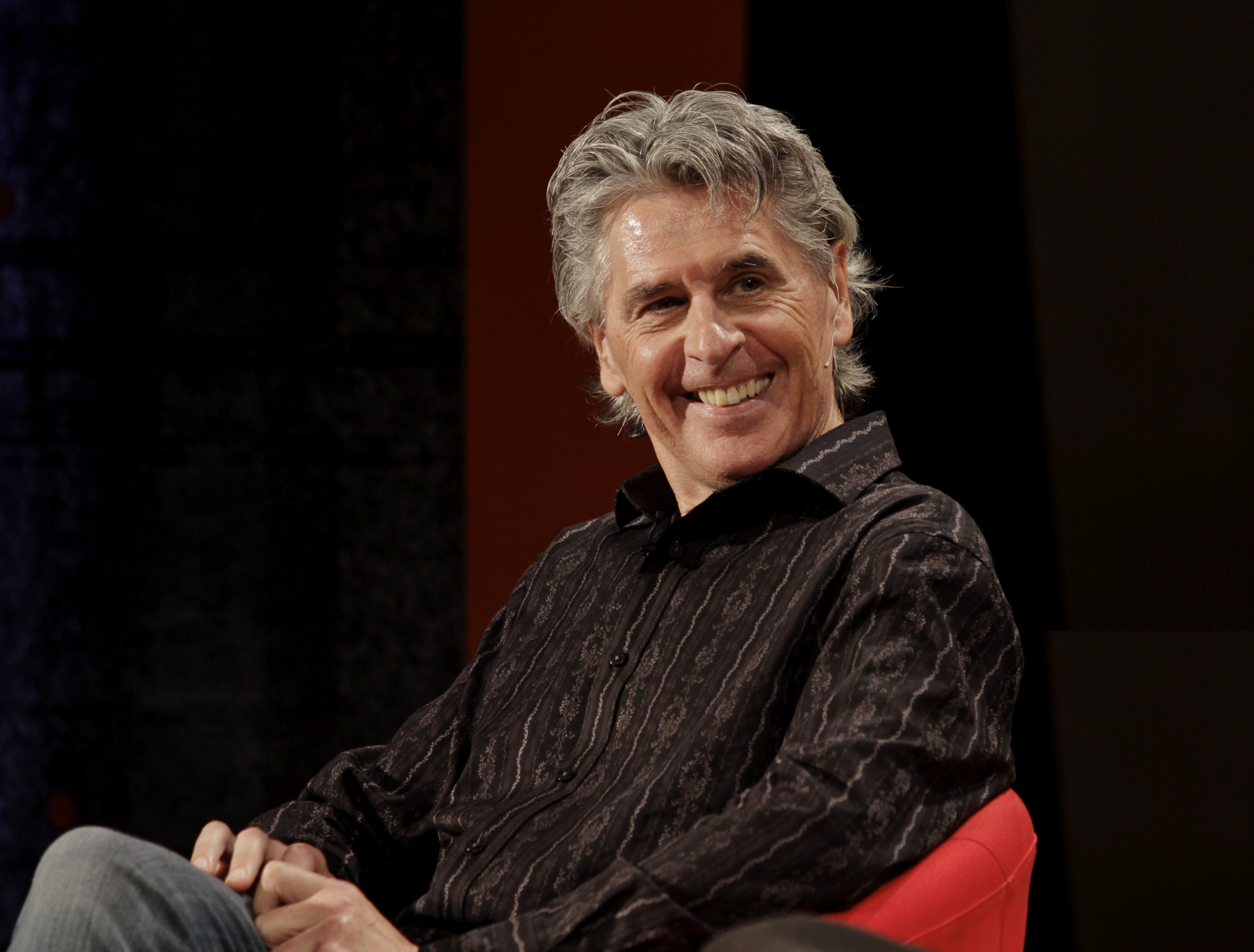
- Keith Devlin in 2011
- Born: 16 March 1947 (age 79); Hull, England
- Education: King's College London; University of Bristol
- Known for: Regular speaker, writer and advocate for improving public understanding of math
- Spouse: Janet Carey (m. 1967)
- Scientific career
- Fields: Mathematics
- Workplaces: Stanford University; King's College London; University of Bristol; University of Manchester; University of Aberdeen; University of Oslo; University of Heidelberg; University of Bonn; University of Toronto; University of Lancaster; Colby College; St. Mary's College of California
- Thesis: Some Aspects of Constructibility (1971)
- Doctoral advisor: Frederick Rowbottom
- Website: profkeithdevlin.org

Keith J. Devlin (born 16 March 1947) is a British and American mathematician and professor emeritus at Stanford University. He is known for his work in mathematical cognition, information theory, and the public communication of mathematics. Devlin has authored more than 30 books and numerous scholarly articles. He was a regular commentator on National Public Radio (NPR) as “the Math Guy” and is the co-founder and President of BrainQuake, an educational technology company that develops mathematics learning games.

== Education ==
He was born and grew up in England, in Kingston upon Hull, where he attended Greatfield High School. Devlin earned a BSc (special) in mathematics at King's College London in 1968, and a mathematics PhD in logic at the University of Bristol in 1971 under the supervision of Frederick Rowbottom.

== Career ==
Later he got a position as a scientific assistant in mathematics at the University of Oslo, Norway, from August till December 1972. In 1974 he became a scientific assistant in mathematics at the University of Heidelberg, Germany. In fall 1976 he was an assistant professor of mathematics at the University of Toronto, Canada. From spring 1977 through 1987 he served as a lecturer, then reader, in mathematics at the University of Lancaster, England. From 1987 to 1989 he was a visiting associate professor of mathematics and philosophy at Stanford University in California. From 1989 to 1993 he was the Carter Professor and Chair of the Department of Mathematics and Computer Science at Colby College in Maine. From 1993 to 2000 he was Dean of Science at St. Mary's College of California.

From 2001 until he retired he was a senior researcher at the Center for the Study of Language, an independent research center at Stanford University. He was also co-founder and executive director of Stanford University's former Human-Sciences and Technologies Advanced Research Institute (2006), and a co-founder of Stanford Media X university-industry research partnership program. He was a commentator on National Public Radio's Weekend Edition Saturday, where he was known as "The Math Guy."

His current research is mainly focused on the use of different media to teach mathematics to different audiences. He is also co-founder and president of the company BrainQuake, which creates mathematics learning video games, which he set up in 2011. Other topics of his research are the theory of information, models of reasoning, applications of mathematical techniques in the study of communication, and mathematical cognition.

As of 2023 he had authored 33 books and over 80 research or expository articles. Most of his books are aimed at a general audience.

== Awards ==
- Joint Policy Board for Mathematics Communications Award, 2001
- In 2007 he received Wonderfest's Carl Sagan Prize for Science Popularization.
- 2004 International Pythagoras Prize in Mathematics, in the category Best Expository Text in the Mathematical Sciences for the Italian translation of The Millennium Problems
- Fellow of the American Mathematical Society, 2012

== Bibliography ==
Articles

- Devlin, Keith I.; Jensen, R. Björn (1975), "Marginalia to a theorem of Silver", ISILC Logic Conference (Proc. Internat. Summer Inst. and Logic Colloq., Kiel, 1974), Lecture Notes in Mathematics, vol. 499, Berlin, New York: Springer-Verlag, pp. 115–142, doi:10.1007/BFb0079419, ISBN 978-3-540-07534-9, MR 0480036 [First proof of Jensen's covering theorem; Keith J. Devlin is credited as Keith I. Devlin in the paper.]

Books

- Constructibility. Springer. 1984. ISBN 3-540-13258-9.
- Logic and Information. Cambridge University Press. 1991. ISBN 0-521-49971-2.
- The Joy of Sets: Fundamentals of Contemporary Set Theory. Springer. 1993. ISBN 0-387-94094-4.
- Mathematics: The Science of Patterns. Holt Paperbacks. 1996. ISBN 0-8050-7344-2.
- Goodbye, Descartes: the End of Logic and the Search for a New Cosmology of the Mind. John Wiley & Sons, Inc. 1997. ISBN 0-471-25186-0.
- The Language of Mathematics: Making the Invisible Visible. Holt Paperbacks. 1998. ISBN 0-8050-7254-3.
- Mathematics: The New Golden Age. Columbia University Press. 1999. ISBN 0-231-11639-X.
- Life by the Numbers. Wiley. 1999. ISBN 0471328227.
- The Math Gene: How Mathematical Thinking Evolved and Why Numbers Are Like Gossip. Basic Books. 2000. ISBN 0-465-01619-7.
- The Millennium Problems: the Seven Greatest Unsolved Mathematical Puzzles of Our Time. Basic Books. 2002. ISBN 0-465-01730-4.
- The Math Instinct: Why You're a Mathematical Genius (Along with Lobsters, Birds, Cats, and Dogs). Thunder's Mouth Press. 2006. ISBN 1-56025-839-X.
- The Numbers Behind NUMB3RS: Solving Crime with Mathematics. Plume. 2007. ISBN 978-0-452-28857-7. with coauthor Gary Lorden
- The Unfinished Game: Pascal, Fermat, and the Seventeenth-Century Letter that Made the World Modern. Basic Books. 2008. ISBN 978-0-465-00910-7.
- The Man of Numbers: Fibonacci's Arithmetic Revolution. Walker Publishing Co. 2011. ISBN 978-0-8027-7812-3.
- Mathematics Education for a New Era: Video Games as a Medium for Learning. A K Peters. 2011. ISBN 978-1-56881-431-5.
- Introduction to Mathematical Thinking. Keith Devlin (18 July 2012). 2012. ISBN 978-0615653631.
