= Behave (book) =

2017 book by Robert Sapolsky

Behave: The Biology of Humans at Our Best and Worst
- Cover of first edition
- Author: Robert Sapolsky
- Language: English
- Subject: Biology of human behavior
- Genre: Popular science
- Publisher: Penguin Press
- Publication date: May 2, 2017
- Publication place: United States
- Pages: 800
- ISBN: 978-1594205071

Behave: The Biology of Humans at Our Best and Worst is a 2017 non-fiction book by American neuroscientist and primatologist Robert Sapolsky. He explains how human behavior is shaped by various biological processes that operate on time scales ranging from less than a second before an action, to millions of years of evolutionary influence. He delves into the causes of violence and aggression, as well as of cooperation and empathy. The book was reportedly derived from Sapolsky's popular lecture series at Stanford University on human biology.

Behave was highly praised for providing "a rich slew of fascinating neurobiology basics" in an accessible and often humorous manner. The book appeared on The New York Times science best seller lists in mid-2017.

== Synopsis ==
Sapolsky announces in the Introduction that when analyzing complex behavior, he will avoid what he calls "categorical thinking": "Putting facts into nice cleanly demarcated buckets of explanation". Rather than favor a single discipline, for instance, advocating the perspective of a psychoneuroendocrinologist, or a bioengineer, or an evolutionary biologist, Sapolsky aims for a interdisciplinary approach: "it is impossible to conclude that a behavior is caused by a gene, a hormone, a childhood trauma, because the second you invoke one type of explanation, you are de facto invoking them all. He summarizes in Chapter One the strategy he will adopt:

A behavior has occurred—one that is reprehensible, or wonderful, or floating ambiguously in between. What occurred in the prior second that triggered the behavior? This is the province of the nervous system. What occurred in the prior seconds to minutes that triggered the nervous system to produce that behavior? This is the world of sensory stimuli, much of it sensed unconsciously. What occurred in the prior hours to days to change the sensitivity of the nervous system to such stimuli? Acute actions of hormones. And so on, all the way back to the evolutionary pressures played out over the prior millions of years that started the ball rolling.

The next eight chapters proceed backwards in time to unravel the neurochemical, hormonal, developmental and evolutionary factors that result in a particular behavior. In the process he provides definitions for dozens of terms (this is where Behave gets its textbook quality as well as being a narrative guide), e.g., explicating the role of the frontal cortex, amygdala, limbic system, and other brain regions that affect decision-making. He discusses the influence of testosterone and neurotransmitters. Throughout these chapters, he inserts several examples involving baboons, which is the species he spent decades studying in East Africa. He concludes the book's first half with a chapter on "The Evolution of Behavior" that explains individual selection, group selection, kin selection, reciprocal altruism, and addresses politically contentious areas like adaptationism, gradualism, and sociobiology.

In the book's second half, Sapolsky explores deeper human questions, such as why we resort to Us vs. Them dichotomies, why we group ourselves into social hierarchies with individuals occupying different ranks, and where our moral sense and moral reasoning come from. In a chapter titled "Biology, the Criminal Justice System, and Free Will", he stakes out a deterministic position that "every human action is inescapably caused by preceding events in the world, including events in the brain." He then considers the implications of this position on the criminal justice system (he later expanded on these ideas in his 2023 book, Determined: A Science of Life Without Free Will).

In the last few chapters, Sapolsky discusses empathy, aggression, and war and peace. He argues that despite much of human history supporting a pessimistic outlook, "there's ground for optimism". He lists his goals as "(a) to evidence that things have improved, that many of our worst behaviors are in retreat, our best ones ascendant; (b) to examine ways to improve this further; (c) to derive emotional support for this venture; to see that our best behaviors can occur in the most unlikely circumstances."

He sums up by reiterating how complicated it is to understand human behavior: "Nothing seems to cause anything; instead everything just modulates something else.... Fixing one thing often messes up ten more, as the law of unintended consequences reigns.... Eventually it can seem hopeless that you can actually fix something, can make things better. But we have no choice but to try. And if you are reading this, you are probably ideally suited to do so."

== Reception ==
Writing in The Guardian, Steven Poole called Behave "a miraculous synthesis of scholarly domains", although he suggested that Sapolsky's insistence on the truth of strict determinism partly undermined the book's "humanistic optimism". Kirkus Reviews labeled Behave "An exemplary work of popular science, challenging but accessible." A reviewer in the Star Tribune considered the book to be Sapolsky's magnum opus as well as "a stunning achievement and an invaluable addition to the canon of scientific literature." In Science magazine, Frans de Waal described Behave as "exceptional in its scale, scope, detail, and writing style".

In The New York Times review, biological anthropologist Richard Wrangham offered statements of praise for Behave, e.g., it is "the textbook you will regret never having had in college", and noted its "hipster humor". But Wrangham—whose own book Demonic Males: Apes and the Origins of Human Violence (1996) asserted that "our warlike ways extend back millions of year to our common ancestor with chimpanzees, who share our predisposition for group aggression"—criticized Sapolsky for being "a partisan critic" with an "unbalanced" thesis that downplays hunter-gatherer violence and "the deep-roots theory of war". Wrangham argued that Sapolsky was led astray by his desire to inject an optimistic note about the human condition: "he seems to feel that if he is to maintain his positive stance he must credit the human species with an evolutionary legacy of nonviolence."
