= CQ Ursae Majoris =

Variable star in the constellation Ursa Major

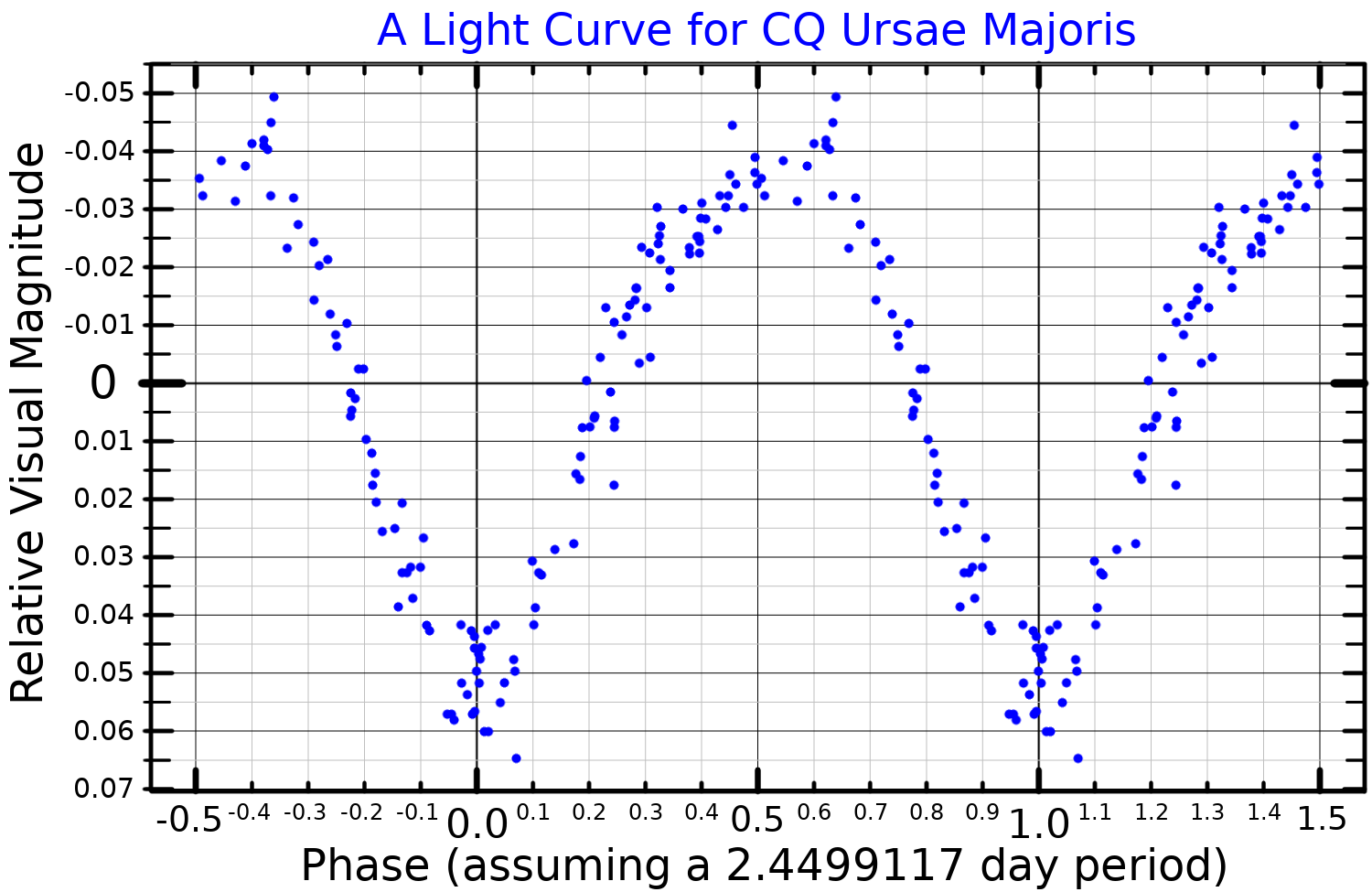
- A visual band light curve for CQ Ursae Majoris, adapted from Mikulášek and Žižňovský (2001)

Observation data Epoch J2000 Equinox ICRS
- Constellation: Ursa Major
- Right ascension: 13^{h} 40^{m} 21.385^{s}
- Declination: +57° 12′ 27.37″
- Apparent magnitude (V): 6.28 to 6.30

Characteristics
- Evolutionary stage: main sequence
- Spectral type: A2IVpSrCr
- Variable type: α^{2} CVn

Astrometry
Radial velocity (R_{v})	−4.1±0.5 km/s
Proper motion (μ)	RA: −49.536 mas/yr Dec.: 25.759 mas/yr
Parallax (π)	11.0048±0.0261 mas
Distance	296.4 ± 0.7 ly (90.9 ± 0.2 pc)

Details
Mass	2.02^{+0.14}_{−0.22} M_{☉}
Radius	1.99±0.23 R_{☉}
Luminosity	19.5+1.9 −1.7 L_{☉}
Surface gravity (log g)	4.17^{+0.83}_{−0.46} cgs
Temperature	8,620±470 K
Metallicity [Fe/H]	−3.56±0.18 dex
Rotational velocity (v sin i)	35.8±3.8 km/s
Age	537+375 −338 Myr

Other designations
- CQ UMa, BD+57°1456, GC 18496, HD 119213, HIP 66700, HR 5153, SAO 28838, PPM 34137

Database references
SIMBAD	data

CQ Ursae Majoris is a variable star in the northern circumpolar constellation of Ursa Major, abbreviated CQ UMa. It is sometimes identified as HR 5153 from the Bright Star Catalogue or HD 119213 in the Henry Draper Catalogue; CQ UMa is the variable star designation. The star ranges in apparent visual magnitude from 6.28 to 6.30, which is bright enough to be dimly visible to the naked eye. It is located at a distance of 296 light years from the Sun based on parallax measurements.

This object was found to be a chemically peculiar star by W. P. Bidelman in 1964, with the spectrum showing strong lines of the element strontium. (This feature had been previously noted by W. E. Harper in 1937.) A. P. Cowley and C. R. Cowley found abnormalities in both strontium and chromium lines. In 1972, E. W. Burke, Jr. and J. T. Howard discovered the star is variable in luminosity with a period of 1.706 days. S. C. Wolff and N. D. Morrison in 1975 found a longer period of 2.451 days, double the earlier estimate.

W. K. Bonsack in 1974 noted peculiarities with the europium lines and found that the lines of ionized calcium and chromium are variable. Z. Mikulášek in 1978 showed that ionized europium lines varied in antiphase with the ionized chromium lines. In 1981, Y. V. Glagolevskij measured a large magnetic field of CQ UMa, interpreting it to be variable and reversing. Z. Mikulášek was able to fit the observations to an oblique rotator model with a concentration of europium-titanium close to the north magnetic pole, a patch of chromium-strontium near the southern pole, and a belt of enhanced iron along the magnetic equator.

CQ Ursae Majoris is classified as a Alpha^{2} Canum Venaticorum variable with a stellar classification of A2IVpSrCr. This is a magnetic Ap star where the variability is modulated by the rotation period. It is spinning with a period of 2.449967 days and has an estimated age of approximately 537 million years. The star has double the mass and twice radius of the Sun. It is radiating 19.5 times the Sun's luminosity from its photosphere at an effective temperature of 8,620 K. The magnetic field of CQ UMa is inclined at an angle of 60°^{+27°}_{−26°} and has a dipole field strength of roughly 2.6 kG.
