= NGC 3978 =

Galaxy in the constellation Ursa Major

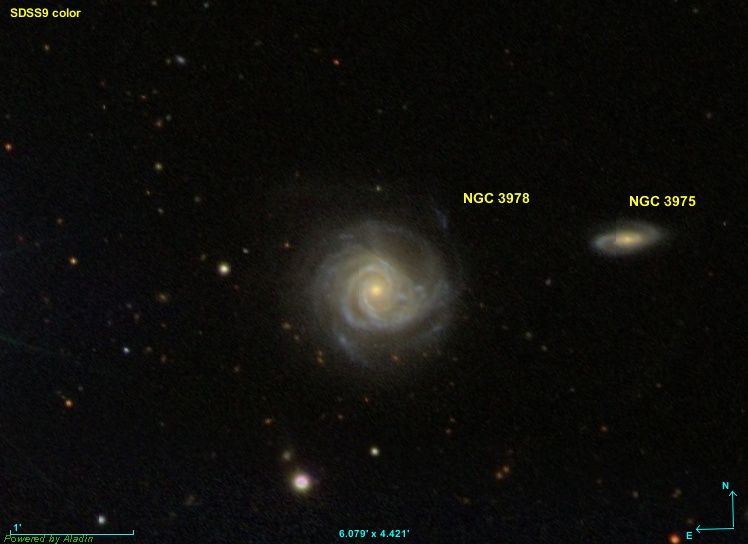
- Sloan Digital Sky Survey image of spiral galaxy NGC 3978 (center) and NGC 3975 (right)

Observation data (J2000 epoch)
- Constellation: Ursa Major
- Right ascension: 11^{h} 56^{m} 10.3326^{s}
- Declination: +60° 31′ 20.969″
- Redshift: 0.033176
- Heliocentric radial velocity: 9,946 km/s
- Distance: 459 Mly (140.7 Mpc)
- Apparent magnitude (V): 13.4

Characteristics
- Type: SABbc, HII, SABbc?
- Size: ~240,600 ly (73.78 kpc) (estimated)
- Apparent size (V): 1.29′ × 1.16′

Other designations
- PGC 37502, UGC 6910, CGCG 292-047, MCG +10-17-105, 2MASX J11561045+6031300, 2MASS J11561030+6031209, HOLM 306A, IRAS 11535+6047, SDSS J115610.31+603121.1, NVSS J115610+603121

NGC 3978 is a large intermediate spiral galaxy with a bar located in the constellation of Ursa Major. It is located 460 million light-years away from the Solar System and was discovered by William Herschel on March 19, 1790, but also observed by John Herschel on April 14, 1831.

NGC 3978 has a luminosity class of II-III and it has a broad H II region which contains regions of ionized hydrogen. In addition, it is categorized as a LINER galaxy by SIMBAD, meaning its nucleus presents an emission spectrum which is characterized by broad lines of weakly ionized atoms.

According to Vaucouleurs and Corwin, NGC 3978 and NGC 3975 form a galaxy pair with each other.

== Supernovae ==
Four supernovae have been observed NGC 3978:

- SN 2003cq was discovered on March 30, 2003, by British astronomer Ron Arbour. It was located 32" east and 2.3" south of the nucleus with a magnitude of 17.1. This supernova was Type Ia.
- SN 2008I was discovered by astronomers P. Thrasher, W. Li, and Alex Filippenko as part of Lick Observatory Supernova Search (LOSS) on January 2, 2008. It was located 3.7" west and 10.4" north of the nucleus with magnitude of 19.1. The supernova was Type II which possibly resulted from a collapse of a massive star.
- SN 2020kay (Type II, mag. 18.5) was discovered by ATLAS on 15 May 2020.
- SN 2025ddb (Type II, mag. 18.566) was discovered by ATLAS on 2 March 2025.
