= Monkeyluv =

2005 book by Robert Sapolsky

Monkeyluv: And Other Essays on Our Lives as Animals
- Author: Robert Sapolsky
- Publisher: Scribner
- Publication date: 20 September 2005
- Pages: 224
- ISBN: 0-7432-6015-5

Monkeyluv: And Other Essays on Our Lives as Animals is a 2005 non-fiction book by Robert Sapolsky. It collects eighteen essays on biological topics previously published by Sapolsky in various magazines, with additional notes and three section introductions. It has been reviewed in The New York Times, Kirkus Reviews, and New Scientist.
