= 5391 Emmons =

Main-belt asteroid

Discovery
- Discovered by: E. F. Helin
- Discovery site: Palomar Obs.
- Discovery date: 13 September 1985

Designations
- Named after: Richard Emmons (American astronomer)
- Alternative designations: 1985 RE_{2} · 1934 RH; 1951 RF_{1} · 1975 VE_{3}
- Minor planet category: main-belt · (inner) background

Orbital characteristics
- Epoch 23 March 2018 (JD 2458200.5)
- Uncertainty parameter 0
- Observation arc: 67.86 yr (24,787 d)
- Aphelion: 2.8087 AU
- Perihelion: 1.7108 AU
- Semi-major axis: 2.2598 AU
- Eccentricity: 0.2429
- Orbital period (sidereal): 3.40 yr (1,241 d)
- Mean anomaly: 220.53°
- Mean motion: 0° 17^{m} 24.36^{s} / day
- Inclination: 2.5123°
- Longitude of ascending node: 336.40°
- Argument of perihelion: 344.75°

Physical characteristics
- Mean diameter: 5.578±0.083 km 5.93 km (calculated)
- Synodic rotation period: 3.028±0.004 h
- Geometric albedo: 0.20 (assumed); 0.298±0.035
- Spectral type: C (assumed); S (SDSS-MOC); S (Pan-STARRS)
- Absolute magnitude (H): 13.2; 13.4; 13.5; 13.57±0.29

5391 Emmons, provisional designation 1985 RE_{2}, is a background asteroid from the inner regions of the asteroid belt, approximately 6 kilometers (4 miles) in diameter. It was discovered on 13 September 1985, by American astronomer Eleanor Helin at the Palomar Observatory. The likely S-type asteroid has a rotation period of 3.0 hours. It was named for American astronomer Richard Emmons.

== Orbit and classification ==
Emmons is a non-family asteroid from the main belt's background population. It orbits the Sun in the inner main-belt at a distance of 1.7–2.8 AU once every 3 years and 5 months (1,241 days; semi-major axis of 2.26 AU). Its orbit has an eccentricity of 0.24 and an inclination of 3° with respect to the ecliptic.

The asteroid was first observed as 1934 RH at the Union Observatory in September 1934. The body's observation arc begins 35 years prior to its official discovery observation with a precovery at Palomar in April 1950.

== Physical characteristics ==
Emmons has been characterized as a common, stony S-type asteroid by the Pan-STARRS' survey and by the SDSS-based taxonomic system (latter poorly secured; LSQ). The asteroid is also a generically assumed C-type.

=== Rotation period ===
In September 2002, a rotational lightcurve of Emmons was obtained from photometric observations by astronomers at the Goodsell Observatory (741). Lightcurve analysis gave a rotation period of 3.028 hours with a brightness amplitude of 0.16 magnitude (U=2).

=== Diameter and albedo ===
According to the survey carried out by the NEOWISE mission of NASA's Wide-field Infrared Survey Explorer, Emmons measures 5.578 kilometers in diameter and its surface has an albedo of 0.298, while the Collaborative Asteroid Lightcurve Link assumes a standard albedo for a stony asteroid of 0.20, and calculates a diameter of 5.93 kilometers based on an absolute magnitude of 13.5.

== Naming ==
This minor planet was named after American astronomer Richard H. Emmons (1919–2005), who was a longtime professor of physics and astronomy at Kent State University and known as "Mr. Astronomy" to the thousands of children and residents who looked at the heavens through his homemade telescopes. From the 1950s to 1963, school children, Boy Scouts, church groups and community organizations visited his North Canton garage, known as "The Star Barn," which he had converted into the area's only planetarium. It seated 38. Emmons was also an early observer of artificial satellites.

The official naming citation was published by the Minor Planet Center on 23 May 2000 (M.P.C. 40701).
