= Robert Sapolsky =

American endocrinologist (born 1957)

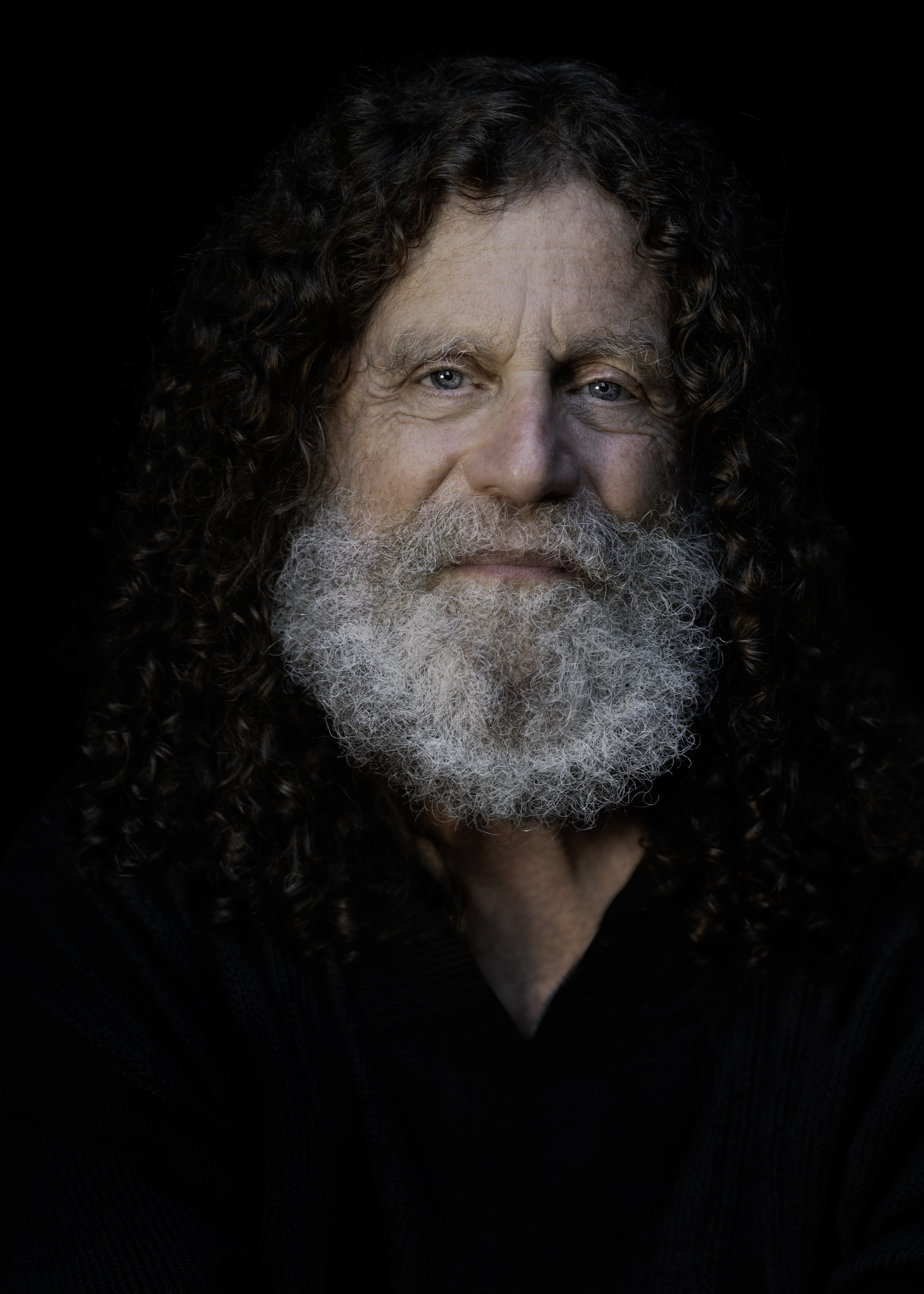
- Sapolsky in 2023
- Born: Robert Morris Sapolsky; April 6, 1957 (age 69); Brooklyn, New York, U.S.
- Education: Harvard University (BA); Rockefeller University (PhD)
- Spouse: Lisa Sapolsky
- Children: 2
- Scientific career
- Fields: Neurobiology, physiology, biological anthropology
- Workplaces: Stanford University; Salk Institute
- Thesis: The Neuroendocrinology of Stress and Aging (1984)
- Doctoral advisor: Bruce McEwen
- Other academic advisors: Melvin Konner

Robert Morris Sapolsky (born April 6, 1957) is an American academic, neuroscientist, and primatologist. He is the John A. and Cynthia Fry Gunn Professor at Stanford University, where he is also a professor of biology, neurology, and neurosurgery. Sapolsky's research has focused on neuroendocrinology, particularly relating to stress. He is also a research associate with the National Museums of Kenya.

== Early life and education ==
Sapolsky was born in Brooklyn, New York, to Jewish immigrants from the Soviet Union. His father, Thomas Sapolsky, was an architect who renovated the restaurants Lüchow's and Lundy's. Robert was raised as an Orthodox Jew and spent his time reading about and imagining living with silverback gorillas. By age 12, Sapolsky was writing fan letters to primatologists. He attended John Dewey High School and by that time was reading textbooks on the subject and teaching himself Swahili.

Sapolsky is an atheist. In his acceptance speech for the Emperor Has No Clothes Award, Sapolsky said, "I was raised in an Orthodox household and I was raised devoutly religious up until around age thirteen or so. In my adolescent years one of the defining actions in my life was breaking away from all religious belief whatsoever."

In 1978, Sapolsky received his B.A., summa cum laude, in biological anthropology from Harvard University. He then went to Kenya to study the social behaviors of baboons in the wild. When the Uganda–Tanzania War broke out in the neighboring countries, Sapolsky decided to travel into Uganda to witness the war up close, later commenting, "I was twenty-one and wanted adventure. [...] I was behaving like a late-adolescent male primate." He went to Uganda's capital Kampala, and from there to the border with Zaire (now the Democratic Republic of the Congo), and then back to Kampala, witnessing some fighting, including the Ugandan capital's conquest by the Tanzanian army and its Ugandan rebel allies on April 10–11, 1979. Sapolsky then returned to New York and studied at Rockefeller University, where he received his Ph.D. in neuroendocrinology working in the lab of endocrinologist Bruce McEwen.

After the initial year-and-a-half field study in Africa, Sapolsky returned every summer for another 25 years to observe the same group of baboons, from the late 1970s to the early 1990s. He spent eight to ten hours a day for approximately four months each year recording the behaviors of these baboons.

== Career ==
Sapolsky is the John A. and Cynthia Fry Gunn Professor at Stanford University, holding joint appointments in several departments, including Biological Sciences, Neurology & Neurological Sciences, and Neurosurgery.

As a neuroendocrinologist, Sapolsky has focused his research on issues of stress and neuronal degeneration, as well as on the possibilities of gene-therapy strategies for protecting susceptible neurons from disease. He is working on gene-transfer techniques to strengthen neurons against the disabling effects of glucocorticoids. Sapolsky spends time in Kenya every year studying a population of wild baboons in order to identify the sources of stress in their environment, and the relationship between personality and patterns of stress-related disease in these animals. More specifically, he studies the differences in cortisol levels between the alpha male and female and the subordinates to determine stress level. An early but still relevant example of Sapolsky's studies of olive baboons is found in his 1990 Scientific American article "Stress in the Wild". He has also written about neurological impairment and the insanity defense within the American legal system.

Sapolsky is also interested in the role of schizotypal disorders in the emergence and development of shamanism and of the major Western religions. In this context, he has noted similarities between obsessive-compulsive behavior and religious rituals.

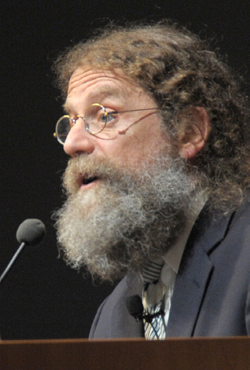
Sapolsky in 2009

Sapolsky's work has featured widely in the press, most notably in the National Geographic documentary Stress: Portrait of a Killer, articles in The New York Times, Wired magazine, the Stanford magazine, and The Tehran Times. His speaking style (e.g., on Radiolab, The Joe Rogan Experience, and his Stanford human behavioral biology lectures) has garnered attention. Sapolsky's specialization in primatology and neuroscience has made him prominent in the public discussion of mental health—and, more broadly, of human relationships—from an evolutionary perspective. In April 2017, Sapolsky gave a TED Talk.

Sapolsky has vigorously argued for a deterministic view of human behavior. According to him, "there is no free will, or at least that there is much less free will than generally assumed when it really matters". Sapolsky argues that human actions are determined by neurobiology, hormones, childhood, and life-circumstances.

Sapolsky has received numerous honors and awards for his work, including a MacArthur Fellowship in 1987, an Alfred P. Sloan Fellowship, and the Klingenstein Fellowship in Neuroscience. Sapolsky was also awarded the National Science Foundation Presidential Young Investigator Award, the Young Investigator of the Year Awards from the Society for Neuroscience, the International Society for Psychoneuroendocrinology, and the Biological Psychiatry Society.

In 2007, Sapolsky received the John P. McGovern Award for Behavioral Science, awarded by the American Association for the Advancement of Science. The following year, he received Wonderfest's Carl Sagan Prize for Science Popularization. In February 2010, Sapolsky was named to the Freedom From Religion Foundation's Honorary Board of distinguished achievers, following the Emperor Has No Clothes Award for 2002. In 2026, he was elected to the National Academy of Sciences.

== Personal life ==
Sapolsky is married to Lisa Sapolsky, a doctor in neuropsychology. They have two children. In 2024, he launched a series of Father-Offspring Interviews on YouTube and Spotify with his daughter Rachel.

In his book Determined: A Science of Life Without Free Will, Sapolsky discussed his personal experiences with depression, revealing the complexities of living with the condition while also highlighting moments of relief provided by medication.

== Views ==
In a podcast interview with Light Watkins called "How To Escape The Rat Race", Sapolsky says that after learning in synagogue about how God "hardened Pharaoh's heart," he woke up one night at 2:00 a.m. as a teenager and said, "Oh, I get it! There is no god and there's no free will. The universe is this big, empty, indifferent place. And that's kinda where I've been at ever since."

== Books ==
- Stress, the Aging Brain, and the Mechanisms of Neuron Death (MIT Press, 1992) ISBN 0-262-19320-5
- Why Zebras Don't Get Ulcers (1994, Holt Paperbacks/Owl 3rd Rep. Ed. 2004) ISBN 0-8050-7369-8
- The Trouble with Testosterone: And Other Essays on the Biology of the Human Predicament (Scribner, 1997) ISBN 978-0-6848-3409-2
- Junk Food Monkeys (Headline Publishing, 1997) ISBN 978-0-7472-7676-0 (UK edition of The Trouble with Testosterone)
- A Primate's Memoir (Touchstone Books, 2002) ISBN 0-7432-0247-3
- Monkeyluv: And Other Essays on Our Lives as Animals (Scribner, 2005) ISBN 0-7432-6015-5
- Behave: The Biology of Humans at Our Best and Worst (Penguin Press, 2017) ISBN 1-5942-0507-8
- Determined: A Science of Life Without Free Will (Penguin Press, 2023) ISBN 978-0525560975

== See also ==
- Animal psychopathology
- Hans Selye
- Mental health of Jesus
- Paul Radin
- Walter Bradford Cannon
- Whitehall Study
