= High Resolution Microwave Survey =

NASA project

The High Resolution Microwave Survey (HRMS) was a NASA project that was to scan ten million frequencies using radio telescopes. A decade in the making, the objective was to find transmissions from alien intelligences. The primary point of observation for the project was the Arecibo Ionospheric Observatory in Puerto Rico. The project began in October 1992 with SETI researcher Jill Tarter on board. However, one year later, first-term Nevada Senator Richard Bryan was responsible for removing funding for the project.
