= Gibor Basri =

American astrophysicist

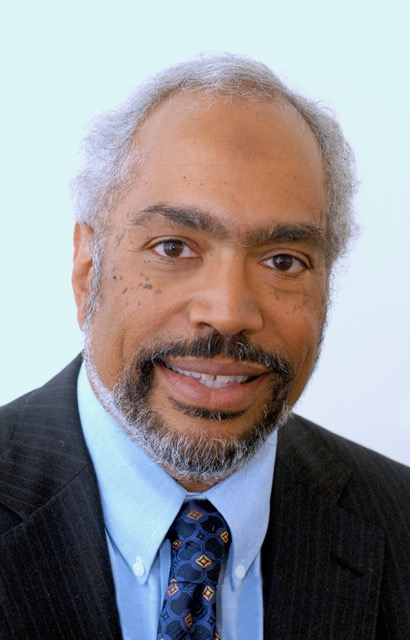
- Born: May 3, 1951 (age 75); New York, USA
- Known for: brown dwarf
- Scientific career
- Fields: physics, astrophysics, astronomy
- Institutions: University of California, Berkeley

Gibor Basri (b. May 3, 1951) is an American astrophysicist, now Professor Emeritus in the Astronomy department at U.C. Berkeley. His research focused on stellar magnetic activity, star formation, and low mass stars and brown dwarfs. He was also the founding Vice Chancellor for Equity & Inclusion at UC Berkeley.

== Early life and family ==
Gibor Basri was born in New York City on May 3, 1951, the son of Saul Basri, professor of physics at the University of Colorado, and Phyllis Basri, a teacher of modern dance and ballet. His father was an Iraqi Jew who grew up in Basra and Baghdad and came to MIT in 1944, remaining in America since then. His mother was Jamaican, and came to New York just before WWII to study dance (she was in Martha Graham's troupe for a little while). They met while both graduate students at Columbia University. Gibor grew up in Fort Collins, Colorado, together with his younger brother David. The family lived for brief periods in Burma (1957) and Sri Lanka (1965). In 1974 he met his wife Jessica Broitman, who became a psychoanalyst and learning disability specialist. Their son was born in 1991.

== Education and awards ==
Basri graduated in physics at Stanford University in 1973, and received his Ph.D. in astrophysics at the University of Colorado in 1979. His thesis, under the supervision of Jeffrey Linsky, was on radiative transfer theory and stellar activity. It was partially based on observations by the International Ultraviolet Explorer (IUE) satellite, of which Linsky's group was one of the first users. A postdoctoral award took him to the U.C. Berkeley astronomy department in 1979. In 1982 he joined the faculty of the Astronomy Department where he has been ever since, becoming a full professor in 1994 and formally retiring in 2015 (though he remains active). GB was awarded a Miller Research Professorship in 1997, and became a Sigma Xi Distinguished Lecturer in 2000. He held a NASA Faculty Fellowship in 2002 and became a Fellow of the California Academy of Science in 2011. Awards from the Berkeley campus include the Chancellor's Award for Increasing Institutional Excellence in 2005 and the Berkeley Citation (highest honor) in 2015. He was the recipient of the Carl Sagan Prize for Science Popularization in 2016. In 2023 he was elected a Fellow of the American Astronomical Society. In 2024 he was selected as the recipient of the Arthur B.C. Walker Award.

== Career ==
=== Astrophysics ===
His work there originally focused on high-energy observations of stars (with Stuart Bowyer) in preparation for the eventual launch of the Extreme Ultraviolet Explorer (EUVE). In the 1980s, he turned to studies of star formation and the study of T Tauri stars as well as continuing investigations into stellar magnetic activity. In the 1990s he was one of the discoverers of brown dwarfs (substellar objects) and became recognized as a world expert on them. As part of that work he invented the method of “lithium dating” that revised the ages of young star clusters upward by 50% or more. These discoveries are described in the book 50 Years of Brown Dwarfs. He was also lead author on the article Brown Dwarfs to Planetesimals: What is a Planet? with Michael Brown. In the 2000s he became a Co-Investigator on NASA's Kepler Mission. He used the precision light curves available for large numbers of stars to study the behavior of starspots and learn more about stellar magnetic activity, In 2022 he published a technical book An Introduction to Stellar Magnetic Fields.

=== Diversity work ===
Basri's extensive work on diversifying the academy (and STEM disciplines in particular is summarized here). He was hired by Robert Birgeneau (Chancellor) as the founding Vice Chancellor for Equity and Inclusion for the U.C. Berkeley campus from 2007 to 2015. He led the campus to a strategic plan for equity and inclusion, played a key role in a number of climate surveys (culminating in one for the whole University of California system), and brought diversity considerations to a stronger role in hiring and search practices, advancement and retention practices, and programmatic review for the campus.

== Selected publications ==
- Basri, G., "The Discovery of the First Lithium Brown Dwarf: PPI 15."
- Bertout, C., Basri, G., and Bouvier, J., “Accretion Disks around T Tauri Stars”.
- Ardila, D. R.; Basri, G., "The Balmer Wavelength Range of BP Tauri."
- Valenti, J. A.; Basri, G.; Johns, C. M., "T Tauri Stars in Blue".
- Basri, G.; Marcy, G. W.; Graham, J. R., "Lithium in Brown Dwarf Candidates: The Mass and Age of the Faintest Pleiades Stars".
- Basri, G., "Observations of Brown Dwarfs".
- Reiners, A.; Basri, G., "The First Direct Measurements of Surface Magnetic Fields on Very Low Mass Stars".
- Reiners, A.; Basri, G., "A Volume-Limited Sample of 63 M7-M9.5 Dwarfs. II. Activity, Magnetism, and the Fade of the Rotation-Dominated Dynamo".
- Basri, G., Shah, R., "The Information Content in Analytic Spot Models of Broadband Precision Light Curves. II. Spot Distributions and Lifetimes and Global and Differential Rotation ".
