= Why Zebras Don't Get Ulcers =

1994 book by Robert Sapolsky

- Author: Robert Sapolsky
- Language: English
- Subject: Stress
- Genre: Non-fiction
- Published: 1994
- Publisher: W. H. Freeman (2nd ed.), Holt Paperbacks (3rd ed.)
- Publication place: US
- Pages: 320
- ISBN: 978-0-7167-3210-5

Why Zebras Don't Get Ulcers is a 1994 (2nd ed. 1998, 3rd ed. 2004) book by Stanford University biologist Robert M. Sapolsky. The book includes the subtitle "A Guide to Stress, Stress-related Diseases, and Coping" on the front cover of its third edition.

== Background and synopsis ==
The title derives from Sapolsky's premise that for animals such as zebras, stress is generally episodic (e.g., running away from a lion), while for humans, stress is often chronic (e.g., worrying about losing one's job). Therefore, many wild animals are less susceptible than humans to chronic stress-related disorders such as ulcers, hypertension, decreased neurogenesis and increased hippocampal neuronal atrophy. However, chronic stress occurs in some social primates (Sapolsky studies baboons) for individuals on the lower side of the social dominance hierarchy.

Sapolsky focuses on the effects of glucocorticoids on the human body, arguing that such hormones may be useful to animals in the wild escaping their predators, (see fight-or-flight response) but the effects on humans, when secreted at high quantities or over long periods of time, are much less desirable. Sapolsky relates the history of endocrinology, how the field reacted at times of discovery, and how it has changed through the years. While most of the book focuses on the biological machinery of the body, the last chapter of the book focuses on self-help.

Why Zebras Don't Get Ulcers argues that social phenomena such as child abuse and the chronic stress of poverty affect biological stress, leading to increased risk of disease and disability.

== Reception ==
The book received mostly positive reviews. Kirkus Reviews called it an "entertaining explanation of how stress affects the body and what we can do to counteract its effects." Barry Keverne wrote in a review for New Scientist: "Everyone can benefit from reading Why Zebras Don't Get Ulcers and gain insights into the workings of the body and mind, and why some of us are more vulnerable than others to stress-related illness."
