= Carl Sagan Prize for Science Popularization =

The Carl Sagan Prize for Science Popularization is an annual $5,000 award presented in honor of the late scientist Carl Sagan by Wonderfest, the San Francisco Bay Area Beacon of Science, to a scientist who has "contributed mightily to the public understanding and appreciation of science."

The scientist receiving the prize must be a resident of one of the nine San Francisco Bay Area counties, and have "a history of accomplishment in scientific research." Though administered by nonprofit Wonderfest, the Sagan Prize was funded by Google in 2015, and by Annual Reviews in 2002 through 2010. (Lack of funding inhibited presentation of the Prize in the intervening years, 2011–2014.)

== Sagan Prize recipients ==
The following people have received the Carl Sagan Prize:

- 2002 — Andrew Fraknoi, professor of Astronomy, Foothill College
- 2003 — Kevin Padian, professor of Integrative Biology, University of California, Berkeley
- 2004 — Alex Filippenko, professor of Astronomy, University of California, Berkeley
- 2005 — Jill Tarter, director, Center for SETI Research, SETI Institute
- 2006 — Paul Berg, professor of Biochemistry, Stanford University
- 2007 — Keith Devlin, executive director, Human-Sciences and Technologies Advanced Research Institute, Stanford
- 2008 — Robert Sapolsky, professor of Biology and Neurology, Stanford University
- 2009 — Geoff Marcy, professor of Astronomy, University of California, Berkeley
- 2010 — Donald Kennedy, emeritus president and professor of Environmental Science, Stanford University
- 2015 — Seth Shostak, senior astronomer and director, Center for SETI Research, SETI Institute
- 2016 — Gibor Basri, professor of the Graduate School, professor emeritus of Astronomy, University of California, Berkeley
- 2017 — Jennifer A. Doudna, professor of Chemistry and of Molecular & Cell Biology, University of California, Berkeley
- 2018 — Peter Gleick, co-founder, president emeritus, Pacific Institute
- 2019 — Dan Werthimer, co-founder and chief scientist, Berkeley SETI Research Center
- 2020 — Matthew Walker, sleep researcher, University of California, Berkeley
- 2021 — Alison Gopnik, professor of Psychology and expert on child development, University of California, Berkeley
- 2022 — Peter Chin-Hong, professor of Medicine and infectious disease expert, University of California, San Francisco
- 2023 — Pascal Lee, planetary scientist, Berkeley SETI Research Center
- 2024 — Renée DiResta
- 2025 — Leonard Susskind
- 2026 — Saul Perlmutter
- 2027 — Usually published in August

Wonderfest's Sagan Prize Selection Committee recommends each year's recipient to Wonderfest's Board of Directors, and the board then formally confirms (or rejects) the recommendation. Wonderfest's long-term goal in presenting the Sagan Prize is to encourage science researchers to make science insights accessible to the general public, thereby promoting the scientific outlook and enlarging the concept of "scientific community."
