= Science Laureates of the United States Act of 2013 =

- Long title: To establish a position of Science Laureate of the United States.
- Announced in: the 113th United States Congress
- Sponsored by: Rep. Zoe Lofgren (D, CA-19)
- Number of co-sponsors: 16

Codification
- U.S.C. sections affected: 5 U.S.C. § 5703
- Agencies affected: United States Congress, Executive Office of the President

Legislative history
- Introduced in the House as H.R. 1891 by Rep. Zoe Lofgren (D, CA-19) on May 8, 2013; Committee consideration by United States House Committee on Science, Space and Technology,

The Science Laureates of the United States Act of 2013 (H.R. 1891) is a bill that would create the position of Science Laureate of the United States, meant to be similar to the United States Poet Laureate. The Science Laureate would spend their term traveling around the country promoting science and research to students and the general public. The bill was introduced into the United States House of Representatives during the 113th United States Congress.

== Provisions of the bill ==
This summary is based largely on the summary provided by the Congressional Research Service, a public domain source.

The Science Laureates of the United States Act of 2013 would establish the position of Science Laureate of the United States. The bill would require the President of the United States to appoint a Science Laureate on the basis of: (1) merit, particularly the ability of such individual to foster and enhance public awareness and interest in science and to provide ongoing significant scientific contributions; and (2) recommendations received by the National Academy of Sciences (NAS) based on those factors. The bill would also encourage each Science Laureate to continue his or her scientific work and directs the NAS to facilitate such Science Laureate's duties. Finally, the bill would require each Science Laureate to serve a term of one or two years.

== Procedural history ==
=== House ===
The Science Laureates of the United States Act of 2013 was introduced by Rep. Zoe Lofgren (D, CA-19) on May 8, 2013. It was referred to the United States House Committee on Science, Space and Technology and the United States House Science Subcommittee on Research and Technology. House Majority Leader Eric Cantor placed H.R. 1891 on the House calendar for the week of September 9, 2013.

== Debate and discussion ==
Supporters of the bill argued that it would bring important attention to the importance of science and the benefits of scientific research, hopefully inspiring more Americans to pursue scientific careers.

One commentator, on learning of the proposed position of "Science Laureate of the United States," immediately nominated Neil deGrasse Tyson for the position, listing several humorous and serious qualifications. Neil deGrasse Tyson was also mentioned on a Wired magazine list of potential nominees alongside Brian Greene, Jill Tarter, Mike Brown, and Sylvia Earle.

Several concerns about the effectiveness of the bill were raised. First, objections were made to the fact that the position lacked a salary, with one commentator pointing out that this would make things very difficult on the scientist who was simultaneously supposed to continue performing their own research (and finding grants for it) and fulfill the role of Science Laureate. A second objection was raised to the decision to make the National Academy of Sciences as the group selecting the official list of candidates since, while they would be well placed to choose an excellent scientist, they might not do a good job of choosing an excellent communicator. A third objection was the possibility for the position to become heavily politicized.

Another source speculated on what considerations should be used to choose a Science Laureate. These included avoiding unrelated controversy, diversity (to better represent a diverse American public), active research, diversity (in research fields, from one laureate to the next), and finding someone willing to do it, despite the position being unpaid.

== See also ==
- List of bills in the 113th United States Congress
- STEM fields
- Science education
