= Richard H. Emmons =

American astronomer and engineer

- Born: May 29, 1919
- Died: June 29, 2005 (aged 86)
- Known for: Established 23 planetariums
- Scientific career
- Fields: Astronomy, engineering

Richard H. Emmons (May 29, 1919 – June 29, 2005) was an American astronomer and engineer.

== Biography ==
=== Life ===
Emmons was born on May 29, 1919. His father, Harry H. Emmons, was an attorney in Stark County, Ohio. Emmons became interested in astronomy after reading a Popular Science article about the 1932 HA, an asteroid that had recently travelled past Earth. He met his wife, Phyllis, through astronomy, of which they shared an interest. Emmons died on June 29, 2005, at the age of 86.

=== Career ===
Emmons worked at Kent State University as a teacher of astronomy and physics. He then became an engineer at the Goodyear Aerospace Corporation. He was the team leader for the North Canton Moonwatch Team, and he established over twenty-three planetariums.

=== Legacy ===
The "Richard H. Emmons Award", named for Emmons and consisting of a plaque and a $500 prize cheque, is awarded annually by the Astronomical Society of the Pacific to teachers of college astronomy. Eligible candidates must demonstrate outstanding achievement in teaching college-level introductory astronomy classes for non-science majors. The recipient is selected by the Awards Committee appointed by the Board of Directors. Should they deem that there is no one worthy in a given year, the Award is not given out that year. In February or March, the secretary of the Society will communicate with the nominee and, if the Award is accepted, it will be announced in the spring of award year. The most recent recipients of the Richard H. Emmons Award include: Terry A. Matilsky from Rutgers in 2012, Douglas Duncan from the University of Colorado and the Fiske Planetarium in 2010 and Alex Filippenko of the University of California, Berkeley in 2008.

The main-belt asteroid 5391 Emmons was named in his honor.

== See also ==
- List of astronomy awards
