= A Primate's Memoir =

2001 book by Robert Sapolsky

A Primate's Memoir: A Neuroscientist's Unconventional Life Among the Baboons
- Author: Robert Sapolsky
- Language: English
- Subject: baboons
- Genre: Non-fiction
- Published: 2001
- Publisher: Simon and Schuster, Scribner
- Publication place: US
- Pages: 304
- ISBN: 978-1-4165-9036-1

A Primate's Memoir: A Neuroscientist's Unconventional Life Among the Baboons is a 2001 book by the American biologist Robert Sapolsky. The book documents Sapolsky's years in Kenya studying baboons as a graduate student. The chapters alternate between describing observations of a troop of baboons and the wildly different culture in Africa that he is increasingly cognizant of. The book portrays an unconventional way of studying neurophysiology to determine the effects of stress on life expectancy.

The book was nominated for The Aventis Prizes for Science Books in 2002.

== Background ==
In his childhood Robert Sapolsky dreamed about living with silverback gorillas. By age 12, he was writing fan letters to primatologists. He attended John Dewey High School and, by that time, he was reading textbooks on the subject and teaching himself Swahili.

In 1978, Sapolsky received his B.A. in biological anthropology summa cum laude from Harvard University. He then went to Kenya to study the social behaviors of baboons in the wild. When the Uganda–Tanzania War broke out in the neighboring countries, Sapolsky decided to travel into Uganda to witness the war up close, later commenting that "I was twenty-one and wanted adventure. [...] I was behaving like a late-adolescent male primate."

After the initial year-and-a-half field study in Africa, he would return every summer for another twenty-five years to observe the same group of baboons, from the late 70s to the early 90s. He spent 8 to 10 hours a day for approximately four months each year recording the behaviors of these primates.

== Reception ==
The book received mostly positive reviews. Bob Nixon wrote in a review for the New York Times that "Sapolsky's earlier works, Why Zebras Don't Get Ulcers and The Trouble With Testosterone, established him as one of the finest natural history writers around. A Primate's Memoir consolidates that reputation while offering something more. This time we are also treated to the nonfiction counterpart of a Bildungsroman, a portrait of the field biologist as a young man." He added: "Sapolsky has a bent for comedy that triumphs in quick, sly asides. Consider, for example, his introduction of a baboon baby he calls Obadiah: 'This was one weird-looking kid. He had a narrow head and long stringy hair that formed an elongated wing in the rear; he looked like a dissipated fin de siècle Viennese neurotic.'" He was also impressed by "sheer variety" of the stories told in the book.

Review by Publishers Weekly says that "Filled with cynicism and awe, passion and humor, this memoir is both an absorbing account of a young man's growing maturity and a tribute to the continent that, despite its troubles and extremes, held him in its thrall."

Kirkus reviews called the book "A wild and wondrous account, filled with passages so funny or so brilliant that the reader wants to grab someone by the arm and demand, “Hey, you just gotta listen to this.”"

Anna Moorhouse from the Journal of Young Investigators noted that "all of the primate characters described in this book are wonderfully well-drawn, and the reader at once falls in love with the baboons, just as Sapolsky did himself" and that Sapolsky wrote not only anecdotes about baboons but also dark sides of field research: "Underneath all the jokes, however, there is a darker undercurrent to the book that explores some of the more frustrating aspects of field biology and even some of the violent politics prevalent in East Africa at the time."
