= Alex Filippenko =

American astrophysicist (born 1958)

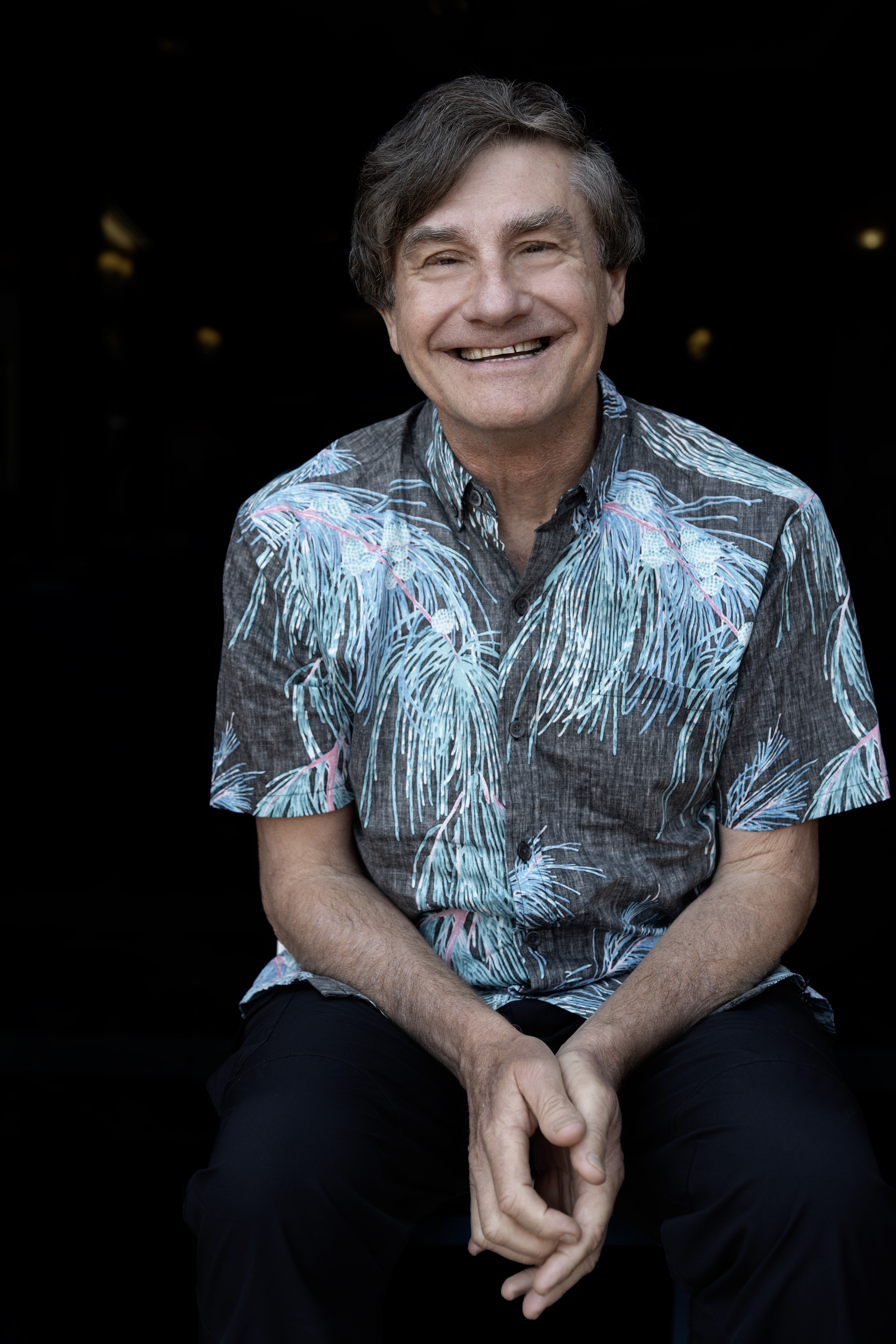
- Born: Alexei Vladimir Filippenko; July 25, 1958 (age 68); Oakland, California, U.S.
- Education: University of California, Santa Barbara (B.A. 1979); California Institute of Technology (Ph.D. 1984)
- Known for: Studies of supernovae, active galaxies, black holes, accelerating expansion of the Universe
- Spouse: Noelle Filippenko
- Children: 4
- Awards: Newton Lacy Pierce Prize in Astronomy; Guggenheim Fellowship; Gruber Prize in Cosmology; Breakthrough Prize in Fundamental Physics; Carnegie/CASE National Professor of the Year; Richard H. Emmons Award; Robert M. Petrie Prize; Richtmyer Memorial Award; Carl Sagan Prize for Science Popularization
- Scientific career
- Fields: Astrophysics
- Workplaces: University of California, Berkeley
- Thesis: Physical conditions in low-luminosity active galactic nuclei (1984)
- Doctoral advisor: Wallace L. W. Sargent
- Other academic advisors: Stanton J. Peale; Hyron Spinrad

Alexei Vladimir "Alex" Filippenko (/fɪlɪˈpɛnkoʊ/; born July 25, 1958) is an American astrophysicist and professor of astronomy at the University of California, Berkeley. Filippenko graduated from Dos Pueblos High School in Goleta, California. He received a Bachelor of Arts in physics from the University of California, Santa Barbara in 1979 and a Ph.D. in astronomy from the California Institute of Technology in 1984, where he was a Hertz Foundation Fellow. He was a postdoctoral Miller Fellow at Berkeley from 1984 to 1986 and was appointed to Berkeley's faculty in 1986. In 1996 and 2005, he was a Miller Research Professor, and he is currently a Senior Miller Fellow. His research focuses on supernovae and active galaxies at optical, ultraviolet, and near-infrared wavelengths, as well as on black holes, gamma-ray bursts, and the expansion of the Universe.

== Research ==
Filippenko is the only person who was a member of both the Supernova Cosmology Project and the High-z Supernova Search Team, which used observations of extragalactic Type Ia supernovae to discover the accelerating universe and its implied existence of dark energy. The discovery was voted the top science breakthrough of 1998 by Science magazine and resulted in the 2011 Nobel Prize in Physics being awarded to the leaders of the two project teams.

Filippenko developed and runs the Katzman Automatic Imaging Telescope (KAIT), a fully robotic telescope which conducts the Lick Observatory Supernova Search (LOSS). During the years 1998–2008, it was by far the world's most successful search for relatively nearby supernovae, finding over 650 of them.

His research, concentrating on optical spectroscopy, showed that many core-collapse supernovae result from massive stars with partially or highly stripped envelopes, helped establish the Type IIn subclass characterized by ejecta interacting with circumstellar gas, observationally identified the progenitors of some supernovae, revealed that many supernovae are quite aspherical, and showed that Type Ia supernovae exhibit considerable heterogeneity—crucial to the development of methods to calibrate them for accurate distance determinations.

Filippenko's early work showed that the nuclei of most bright, nearby galaxies exhibit activity physically similar to that of quasars, driven by gas accretion onto a supermassive black hole. He is also a member of the Nuker Team which uses the Hubble Space Telescope to examine supermassive black holes and determined the relationship between a galaxy's central black hole's mass and velocity dispersion. In half a dozen X-ray binary stars, he provided compelling dynamical evidence for a stellar-mass black hole. His robotic telescope (KAIT) made some of the very earliest measurements of the optical afterglows of gamma-ray bursts.

The Thompson-Reuters "incites" index ranked Filippenko as the most cited researcher in space science for the ten-year period between 1996 and 2006.

== In the media ==
Filippenko is frequently featured in the History Channel series The Universe, as well as in the series How the Universe Works. Overall, he has participated in more than 120 science documentaries.

Filippenko is the author of and teacher in an eight-volume teaching series on DVD called Understanding the Universe. Organized into three major sections in ten smaller units, this series of 96 half-hour lectures covers the material of an undergraduate survey course for An Introduction to Astronomy (the series' subtitle). His other videos courses are Black Holes Explained and Skywatching: Seeing and Understanding Cosmic Wonders.

With co-author Jay M. Pasachoff, Filippenko also wrote the award-winning introductory textbook The Cosmos: Astronomy in the New Millennium, now in its fifth edition (2019).

== Honors and awards ==
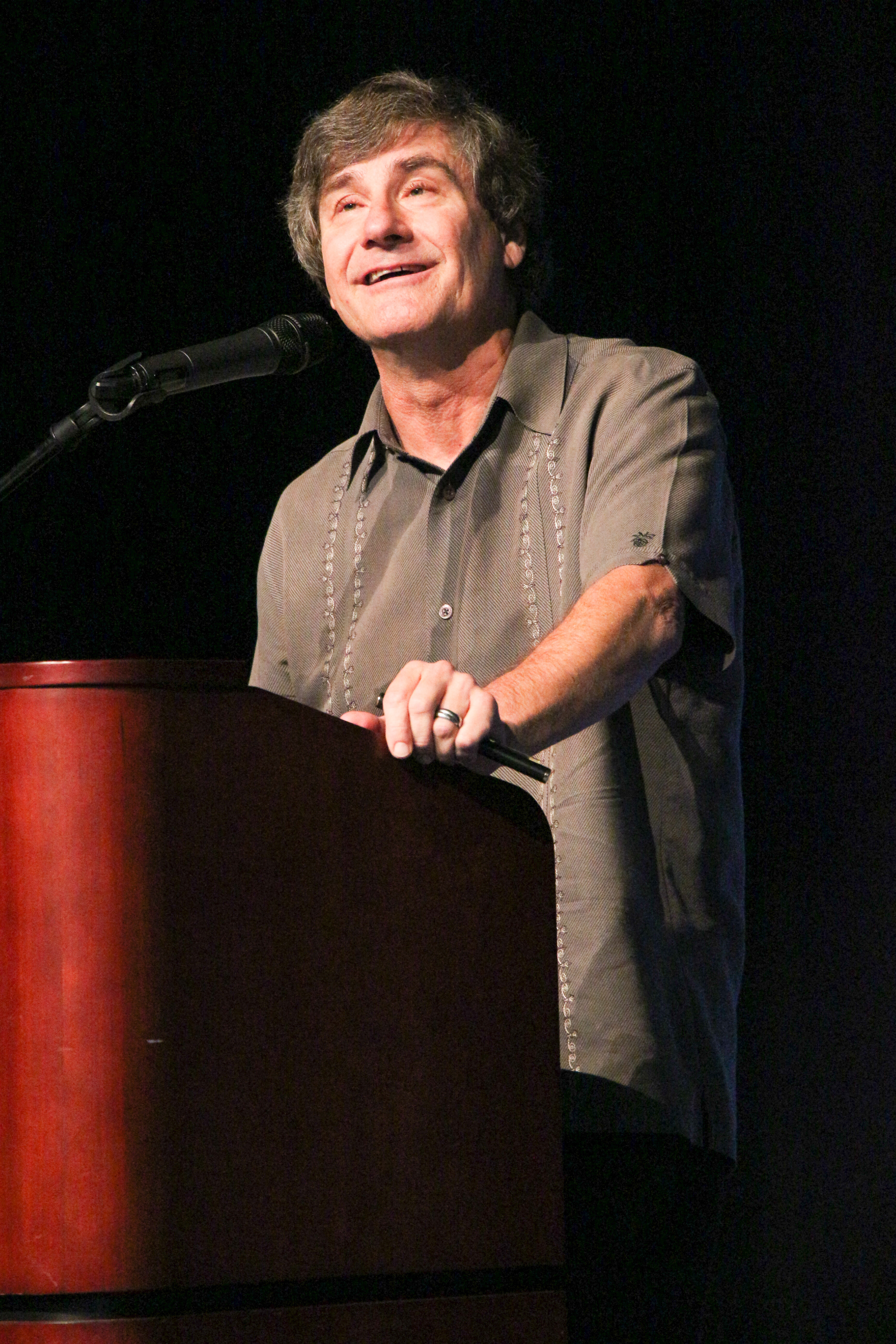
Dr. Filippenko speaks at Menlo School

Filippenko was awarded the Newton Lacy Pierce Prize in Astronomy in 1992 and a Guggenheim Fellowship in 2000. In 1997, the Canadian Astronomical Society invited him to give the Robert M. Petrie Prize Lecture for his significant contributions to astrophysical research. He was also invited to give the 42nd Oppenheimer Memorial Lecture in 2012. He was recognized in the 2007 Gruber Cosmology Prize for his work with then Miller Postdoctoral Fellow Adam G. Riess and for his highly specialized contributions in measurement of the apparent brightness of distant supernovae, which accurately established the distances that support the conclusion of an increasingly rapid expansion of the universe. (Riess shared the 2011 Nobel Prize in Physics for the discovery.) Filippenko was elected to the California Academy of Sciences in 1999, the National Academy of Sciences in 2009, and the American Academy of Arts and Sciences in 2015. In 2021 he was elected as a Fellow of the American Astronomical Society. He shared the 2015 Breakthrough Prize in Fundamental Physics with Brian P. Schmidt, Adam Riess, Saul Perlmutter, the High-Z Supernova Search Team, and the Supernova Cosmology Project.

In addition to recognition for his scholarship, he has received numerous honors for his undergraduate teaching and public outreach, including the 2007 Richtmyer Memorial Award given annually by the American Association of Physics Teachers and the Carl Sagan Prize for Science Popularization by Wonderfest in 2004. In 2006 Filippenko was awarded the US National Professor of the Year Award, sponsored by The Carnegie Foundation for the Advancement of Teaching and administered by the Council for Advancement and Support of Education (CASE). He also won the 2010 Richard H. Emmons Award for excellence in college astronomy teaching, issued by the Astronomical Society of the Pacific. In 2022, he was awarded the American Astronomical Society's Education Prize. His teaching awards at Berkeley include the Donald S. Noyce Prize for Excellence in Undergraduate Teaching in the Physical Sciences as well as other awards recognizing his undergraduate instruction and mentorship. The Berkeley student body has also voted him nine times as the university's "Best Professor".

He served as President of the Astronomical Society of the Pacific from 2001 to 2003. In 1988, he was selected for a UC Santa Barbara Distinguished Alumni Award, and in 2017 he received a Caltech Distinguished Alumni Award. In 2021, he became an elected fellow of the American Astronomical Society, and in 2022, the society awarded him the AAS Education Prize.

== Controversies ==
In April 2015, Filippenko forwarded an email message from UC Santa Cruz Professor Sandra Faber regarding the controversial construction of the Thirty-Meter Telescope on Mauna Kea. In that message, Faber stated that "The Thirty-Meter Telescope is in trouble, attacked by a horde of native Hawaiians who are lying about the impact of the project on the mountain and who are threatening the safety of TMT personnel. Government officials are supporting TMT’s legality to proceed but are not arresting any of the protestors who are blocking the road.". Faber encouraged astronomers to read more about the TMT protests and to sign a pro-TMT petition written by Mailani Neal, a native Hawaiian high-school student. Filippenko forwarded that email to a group of more than 200 astronomers on U.C. Berkeley's astronomy e-mail list, stating "From Sandy Faber (but I support what she says)." Some people inside and outside of the astronomy community reacted with shock and opposition to the e-mails, the allegedly false claim that TMT personnel were in danger (personnel were not allowed to pass, with verbal and potential physical threats to those who wanted to do so), and the reference to a "horde of native Hawaiians who are lying."

After briefly apologizing in a hastily written email message sent from his iPhone, Filippenko later issued a longer statement. There, he appears to sincerely apologize for not editing Faber's message before forwarding it, explaining that he had been busy in an administrative meeting at that time and had not carefully read her message. He explicitly acknowledges the “insensitive and inflammatory” language that had been used in Faber's message, saying that he had meant to write “I support the petition” instead of “I support what [Faber] says.” Filippenko's statement also argues against the anti-TMT position of many Native Hawaiians, claiming good-faith negotiations with Native Hawaiians communities, and otherwise justifying the siting of the TMT over some Native Hawaiian objection to further desecration of a site sacred to them. Such sentiments have been expressed by many others as well. The American Astronomical Society issued a statement reiterating its formal anti-racist stance and noted the disagreement over whether Filippenko's apology was indeed "sincere and unqualified." Both Faber and Filippenko have refused media requests for comment since the incident.

== Personal life ==
Filippenko is married to Noelle Filippenko and has four children: Zoe, Simon, Caprielle, and Orion.
