= Determined: A Science of Life Without Free Will =

2023 book by Robert Sapolsky

- Author: Robert Sapolsky
- Language: English
- Subject: Free will
- Genre: Non-fiction
- Published: 2023
- Publisher: Penguin Press
- Publication place: US
- Pages: 528
- ISBN: 978-0-525-56097-5

Determined: A Science of Life Without Free Will is a 2023 nonfiction book by American neuroendocrinology researcher Robert Sapolsky concerning the neurological evidence for or against free will. Sapolsky generally concludes that our choices are determined by our genetics, experience, and environment, and that the common use of the term "free will" is erroneous. The book also examines the "ethical consequences of justice and punishment" in a model of human behavior that dispenses with free will.

== Reception ==
A review in The Los Angeles Times said of the book: "What he's written is stimulating to read, even for those who doubt his conclusions." A review in Science found it to have a "dismissive attitude toward how determinism might be compatible with free will" but was "well written" and "worth reading". Psychology Today's reviewer concluded it was "witty and engaging...a goldmine of fascinating information". A negative review by philosopher John Martin Fischer in Notre Dame Philosophical Reviews found that "despite all the commotion over it, [the book] does not offer anything new or illuminating about free will or moral responsibility." Andrew Crumey, writing in The Wall Street Journal, described Determined as "outstanding for its breadth of research, the liveliness of the writing, and the depth of humanity it conveys."

A critical review by Adam Piovarchy of the Institute for Ethics and Society says that the book does not achieve what it sets out to do and that "Sapolsky’s broader mistake seems to be assuming his questions are purely scientific: answered by looking just at what the science says." Philosopher Kieran Setiya in a negative review for The Atlantic criticises Sapolsky for not engaging with the philosophical literature on the question but praises his presentation of the science of decision-making.

Jessica Riskin in her review of Determined: A Science of Life Without Free Will for The New York Review of Books writes: "Science can't prove there's no free will because the question of free will is not a scientific question but a philosophical one. To misrepresent it as a scientific question is a prime example of scientism – of extending the claims of science beyond its bounds."
