= Sidney C. Wolff =

American astrophysicist

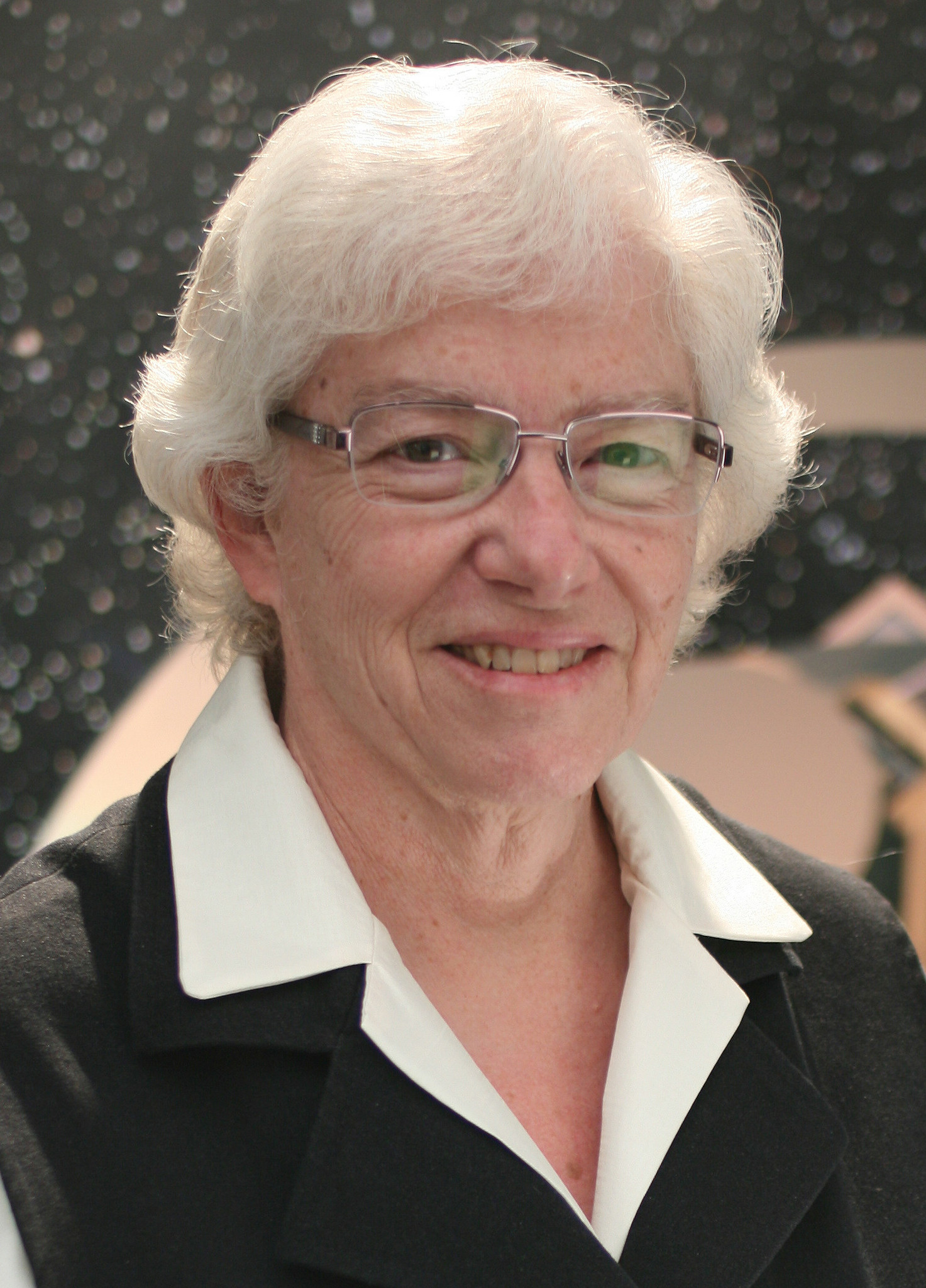
- Born: Sidney Carne; 1941 (age 84–85); Sioux City, Iowa
- Education: BS Astronomy (1962), PhD Astronomy (1966)
- Alma mater: Carleton College; University of California, Berkeley
- Occupations: Astrophysicist, researcher, public educator, author
- Scientific career
- Thesis: A Spectroscopic and Photometric Study of the Peculiar A-Stars (1966)
- Doctoral advisor: George Preston

Sidney Carne Wolff (born 1941) is an American astrophysicist, researcher, public educator, and author. She is the first woman in the United States to head a major observatory, and she provided significant contributions to the construction of six telescopes. Wolff served as Director of the Kitt Peak National Observatory (KPNO) and the National Optical Astronomy Observatory (NOAO). She is a member of the International Astronomical Union's Division G: Stars and Stellar Physics.

== Early life ==
Sidney Carne was born in Sioux City, Iowa in 1941 and is the oldest child of George Albert Carne and Ethel (Smith) Carne. Due to her father's occupational promotions, she transferred schools often and went to five grade schools, becoming interested in astronomy in the third grade after a spelling lesson with astronomical words. Wolff also attended three high schools: one in St. Louis, Missouri, and Bensonville and York High School, both in the suburbs of Chicago, Illinois. Despite her transitions, her father encouraged her to take several math courses in high school which allowed her to study astronomy in college.

After graduating high school at the age of 17, she went on to study at Carleton College, a private liberal arts college in Northfield, Minnesota. Though she considered a major in Latin, Wolff received a bachelor's degree in astronomy in 1962, and married Richard James Wolff that August.

== Career ==
=== PhD and postdoctoral research ===
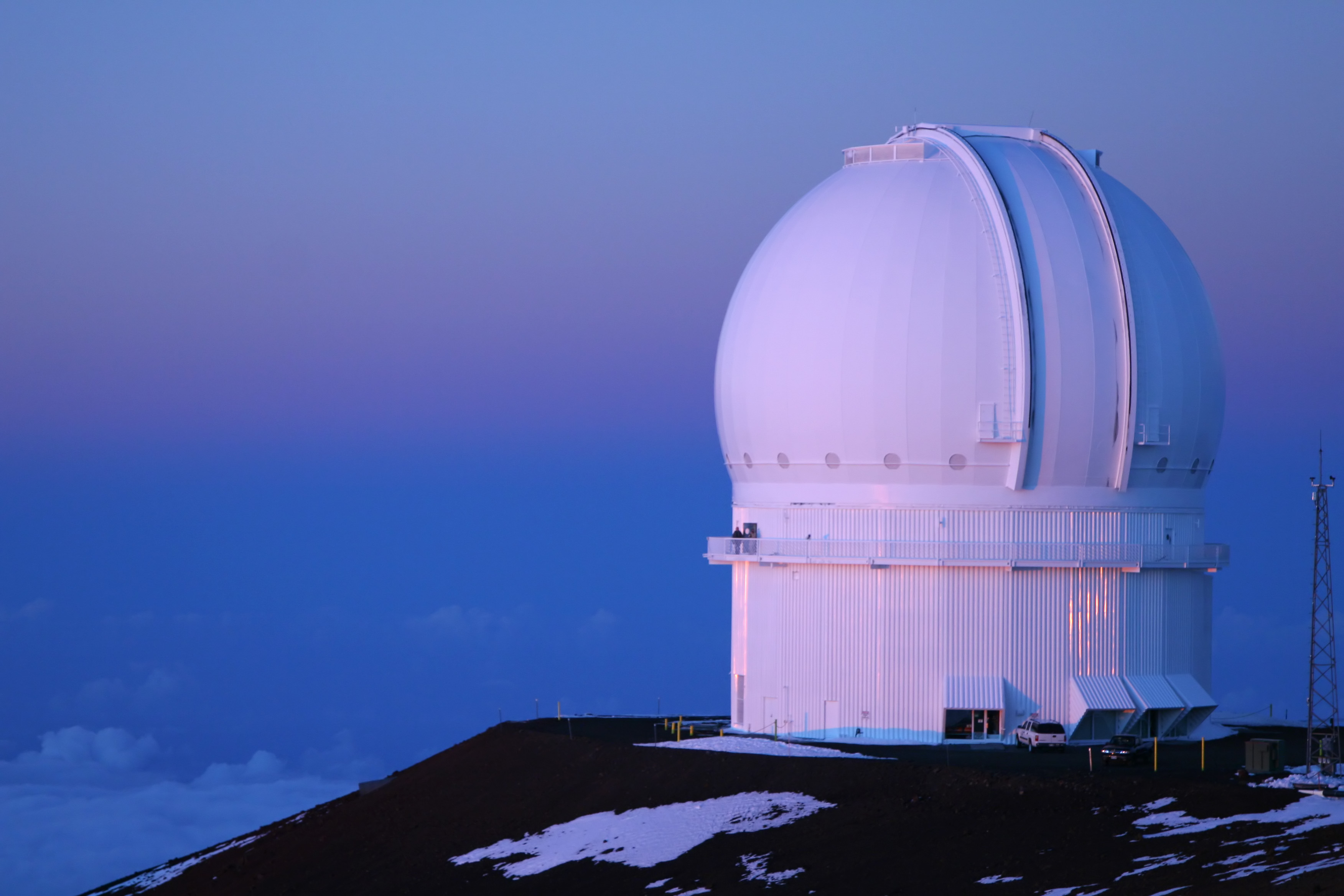
The CFH telescope was built due to image clarity on the mountain and is the first telescope Wolff helped develop.

After graduating, Wolff went on to earn her PhD in astronomy at the University of California, Berkeley in 1966. While at Berkeley, she conducted research on binary stars with astronomer George Wallerstein. She also worked on a research project with her primary adviser and astronomer, George Preston, for her thesis which focused on stellar astronomy and A stars, a relatively new subject for astronomers at the time. Her thesis is titled A Spectroscopic and Photometric Study of the Peculiar A-Stars. After earning her PhD, Wolff continued researching A stars and the nature of their magnetic fields and variability during her postdoctoral research which she began by commuting between the Lick Observatory at the University of California, Santa Cruz and Berkeley.

She soon accepted a job opportunity for a new program and joined the Institute for Astronomy at the University of Hawaii where she worked as an assistant and associate astronomer from 1971 to 1976. While in Hawaii, Wolff spent 17 years contributing to the conversion of Mauna Kea into one of the world's top sites for astronomy. At an elevation of 14,000 feet (4,300 m), Mauna Kea is one of the clearest image sites due to its height and dryness. This changed ground-based astronomy and gained the attention of other astronomical organizations, eventually leading to the installation of the Canada-France-Hawaii telescope. Wolff also contributed to the construction of the SOAR 4.1-meter telescope at the Cerro Tololo Inter-American Observatory near La Serena, Chile.

=== Leadership ===
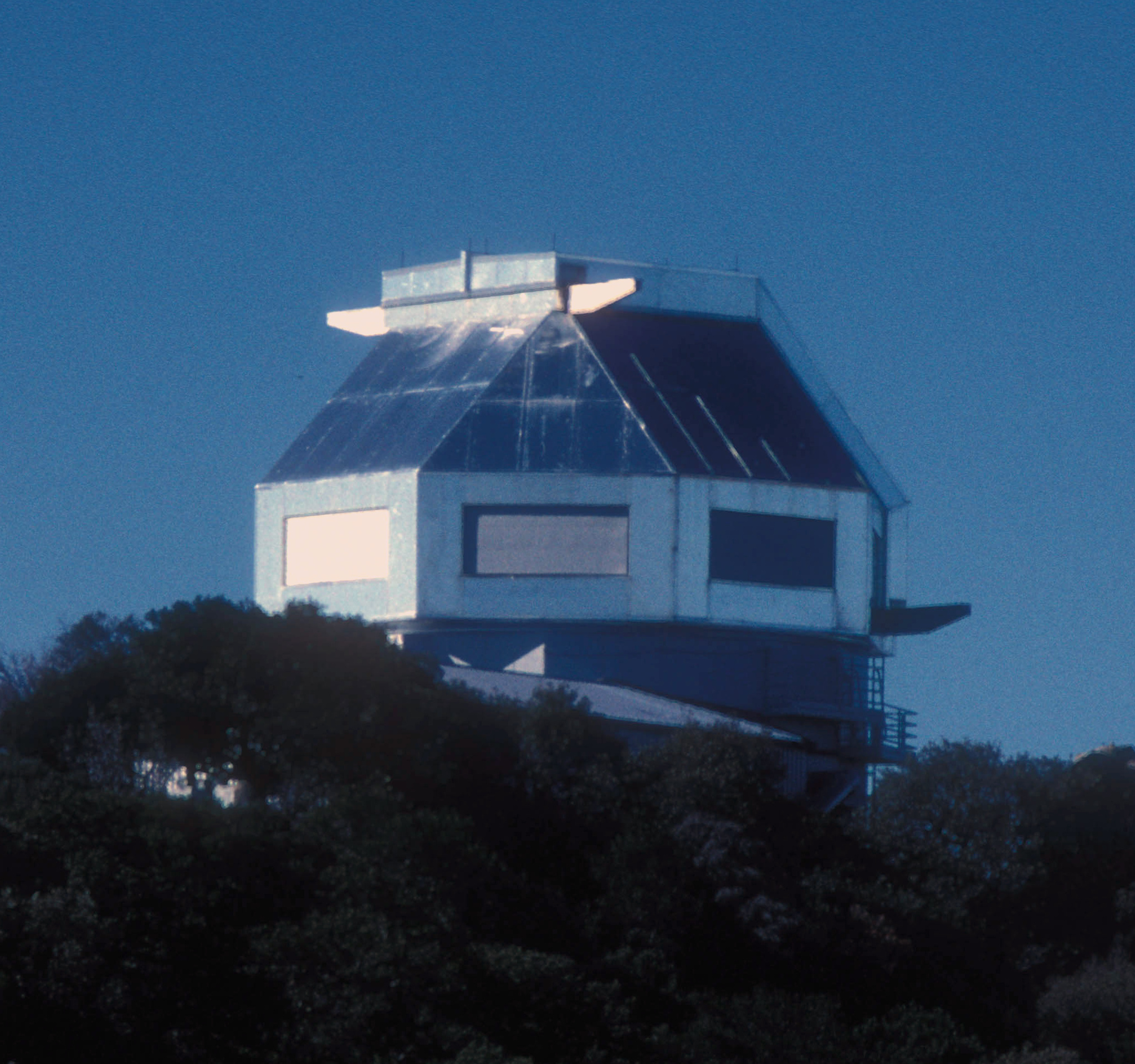
The WIYN observatory on Kitt Peak is renowned and partly developed by Wolff.

Wolff's leadership experience began in 1976, when she began serving as the associate director of the Institute for Astronomy at the University of Hawaii until 1983 and later became acting director until 1984. Later that year, Wolff left Hawaii as she was named Director of the Kitt Peak National Observatory (KPNO) in Tucson, Arizona until 1987. During her time at Kitt Peak, she contributed to the development of the WIYN 3.5-meter telescope.

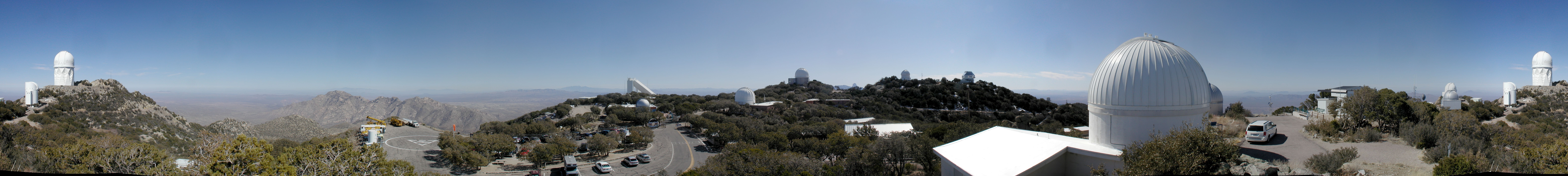
Panorama taken of Kitt Peak National Observatory in Arizona where Wolff researched and worked on the development of telescopes.

In the spring of 1987, Wolff was named the Director of the National Optical Astronomy Observatories until 2001. This made her the first woman in American history to lead a major observatory and the longest serving director of NOAO. In 1985 and 1986, Wolff became the second woman to hold the position of President of the Astronomical Society of the Pacific and again as President of the American Astronomical Society in 1992.

From 1992 to 1994, Wolff served as the first Director of the Gemini Project and played a major role in the proposal of the Gemini 8-Meter Telescopes Project.

=== Membership ===
Wolff has been an active member of the International Astronomical Union (IAU) since the 1980s and is a current member of Division G Stars and Stellar Physics. The division consists of over 3,000 members and is focused on understanding star masses, how they evolve, and their properties by using research techniques such as observation, theory, measurements, and predictions about stars and stellar physics. Wolff was also a former Organizing Committee Member of Commission 29 Stellar Spectra from 1982 to 1988 and a member of Division IV stars until 2012. Until 2015, Wolff was also a member of Commission 29 Stellar Spectra and Commission 36 Theory of Stellar Atmospheres. In addition to being a member of the IAU, Wolff is also a member of the Royal Astronomical Society and the American Astronomical Society.

== Publications ==
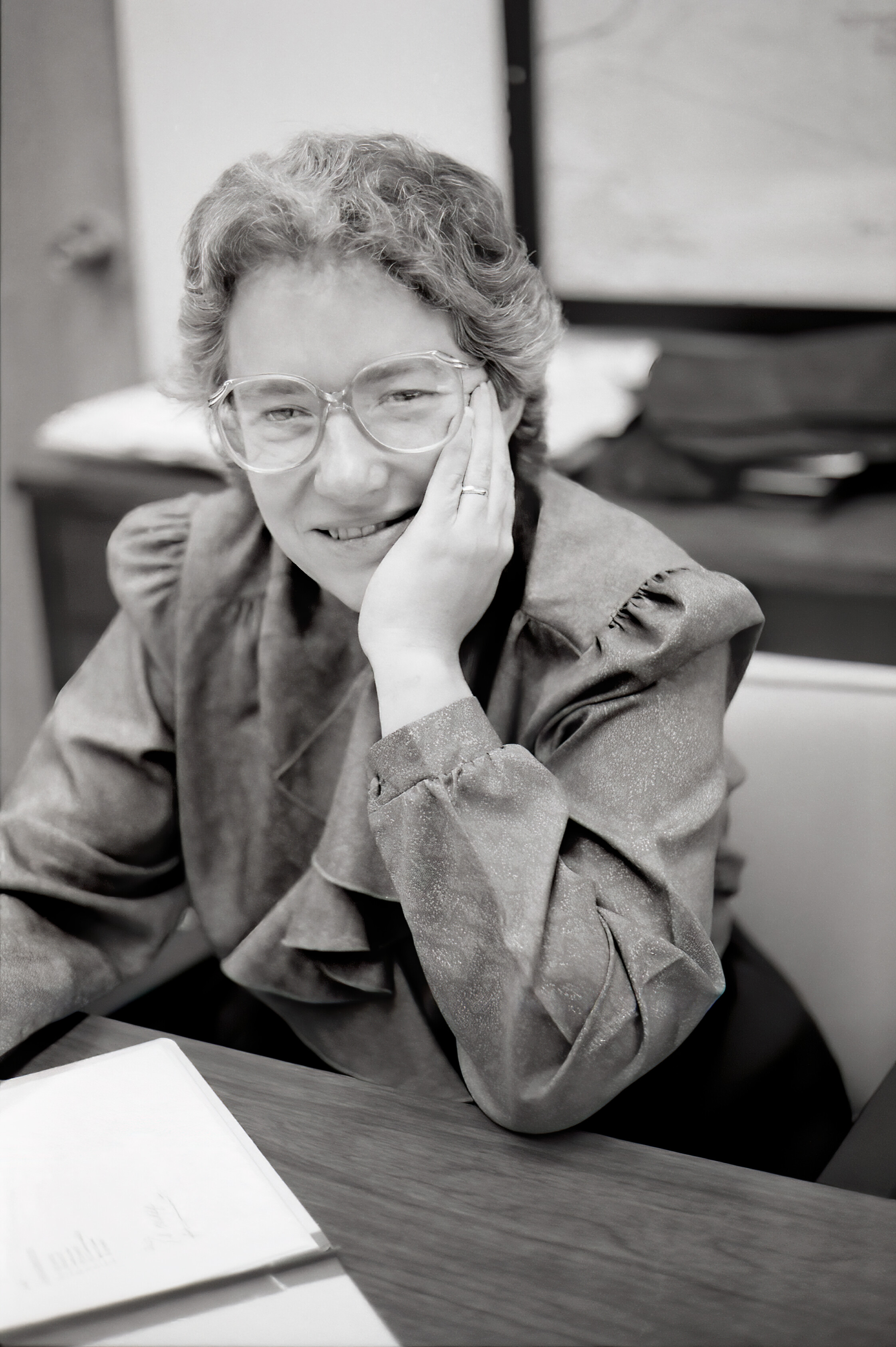
Wolff in September 1984

In 1987, Wolff began writing college introductory astronomy textbooks with astronomer David Morrison and later added Andrew Fraknoi, former Executive Officer of the Astronomical Society of the Pacific, to their team. Together, the three scholars produced "Voyages through the Universe," later also issued in two volumes as Voyages to the Stars and Galaxies and Voyages to the Planets. In 2017, the three of them produced a free, on-line introductory textbook "Astronomy" for the non-profit OpenStax project. Other books authored by Wolff include The Boundless Universe: Astronomy in the New Age of Discovery and The A-Type Stars – Problems and Perspectives (1983).

In 2002, Wolff co-founded the Astronomy Education Review, the first online peer-reviewed astronomy journal for researchers and educators. The journal was published through the American Astronomical Society and was edited by Wolff and fellow astronomer Andrew Fraknoi. Wolff has also co-authored several proposals including a four volume proposal for the Gemini 8-Meter Telescope which took two years to complete.

== Awards and recognition ==
In 2006, the American Astronomy Society awarded Wolff with the 2006 Education Prize for her consistent dedication to astronomy and space sciences and leadership skills.

In 2020 she was elected a Legacy Fellow of the American Astronomical Society.
