= Wonderfest =

'Wonderfest', the San Francisco Bay Area "Beacon of Science," is a nonprofit corporation founded in California dedicated to informal science education.

== Overview ==
Wonderfest achieved full corporate independence in September 2011. During the prior fourteen years, Wonderfest used to be an educational project of, first, San Francisco University High School, and then, The Branson School. From 1998 to 2010, Wonderfest produced annual science festivals — the first such community-wide event in the United States — that presented a series of expert dialogues, based on topics of scientific controversy. The topics in these dialogues were varied, often covering astronomy, biology, psychology, physics, but also covering other categories. In 2011, this festival was supplanted by the Bay Area Science Festival, which was headquartered at the University of California, San Francisco.

Wonderfest, subtitled "The Bay Area Beacon of Science," is dedicated to the memory of Carl Sagan. Since 2011, it has produced public science presentations by Bay Area researchers. From 2002 through 2010, and 2015-present, Wonderfest awarded the $5,000 Carl Sagan Prize for Science Popularization. Wonderfest "Science Envoys" are PhD students at Stanford and UC Berkeley who train to become effective science communicators.

Wonderfest's founding director is Tucker Hiatt, a physics teacher and a former Stanford Visiting Scholar. The board of directors now guides its development:

- Jacob Bien -- Associate Professor of Statistics for University of Southern California
- Jack Conte -- Musician, videographer and CEO of Patreon
- Alexander Eccles -- Musician and composer
- Alex Filippenko -- Professor of Astronomy at the University of California, Berkeley
- Maribel Fraser -- Emeritus Director of Information Technology for AT&T
- Juliana Gallin -- Author and creator of 'Ask a Scientist'
- Howard Rheingold -- Author and Educator
- Kendra Kramlich -- Financial Planner and Science Enthusiast
- Robert Strong -- Comedy Magician, San Francisco
- Eric Yao -- Bioinformatician, Wonderfest Technical Director & Board Chair

Emeritus Board Members

- Eugenie Scott, Founding Director for National Center for Science Education
- Richard Zare, Professor of Chemistry for Stanford University

== Sources ==
- Keay Davidson (August 13, 1998). "Wonderfest - A weekend of scientific debate and lectures". San Francisco Chronicle. San Francisco: Hearst. ISSN 1932-8672.
- "Astronomer Geoff Marcy, Earth's Premier Planet Hunter, Wins Carl Sagan Prize". prnewswire.com (Press release). October 22, 2009.
