= List of interstellar radio messages =

This is a list of notable interstellar radio messages (IRMs) transmitted from Earth. Many of these were sent in the aim of searching for extra-terrestrial intelligence (SETI), and are often called 'active SETI' or 'METI' (Messages to Extra-Terrestrial Intelligence) projects.

== Notable transmissions ==
Stars to which messages were sent include:

Target	Distance (ly)	Sent	Expected Arrival	Message
Messier 13	25,000	16 November 1974	25974	Arecibo message
Altair	16.7	15 August 1983	2000	Message to Altair (CALL to the COSMOS'83)
16 Cyg A	69	24 May 1999	2068	Cosmic Call 1
15 Sge	57	30 June 1999	2056	Cosmic Call 1
HD 178428	67	30 June 1999	2066	Cosmic Call 1
Gl 777	52	1 July 1999	2051	Cosmic Call 1
HD 197076	68	29 August 2001	2069	Teen Age Message
47 UMa	46	3 September 2001	2047	Teen Age Message
37 Gem	56	3 September 2001	2057	Teen Age Message
HD 126053	57	3 September 2001	2058	Teen Age Message
HD 76151	55	4 September 2001	2052	Teen Age Message
HD 193664	57	4 September 2001	2058	Teen Age Message
Gliese 49	32	6 July 2003	2036	Cosmic Call 2
Gliese 208	37	6 July 2003	2040	Cosmic Call 2
55 Cnc	41	6 July 2003	2044	Cosmic Call 2
HD 10307	41	6 July 2003	2044	Cosmic Call 2
47 UMa	46	6 July 2003	2049	Cosmic Call 2
Polaris	433	4 February 2008	2439	Across the Universe
Gliese 581	20.3	9 October 2008	2029	A Message From Earth
Gliese 581	20.3	28 August 2009	2030	Hello From Earth
TZ Arietis	14.6	9 November 2009	2024	RuBisCo Stars (RuBisCO genetic sequence)
Teegarden's Star	12.5	9 November 2009	2021	RuBisCo Stars (RuBisCO genetic sequence)
Kappa¹ Ceti	29.8	10 November 2009	2039	RuBisCo Stars (RuBisCO genetic sequence)
HIP 34511	140	15 August 2012	2152	Wow! Signal Reply
37 Gem (HIP 33277)	57	15 August 2012	2069	Wow! Signal Reply
HIP 43587	41	15 August 2012	2053	Wow! Signal Reply
Gliese 526	17.6	2013	2031	Lone Signal
Polaris	433	10 October 2016	2450	A Simple Response to an Elemental Message
Luyten b	12.36	16 October 2017	2030	Sónar Calling GJ273b
Luyten b	12.36	14 May 2018	2031	Sónar Calling GJ273b

== Other projects ==
Some other projects include:

- Poetica Vaginal (1986)
- Discovery Channel Message (2005)
- Craigslist Messages (2005)
- CNES Cosmic Connexion (2006)
- Doritos Advert (2008)
- Sent Forever
- Penguin UK

Whilst not an interstellar message, it is also worth mentioning The Morse Message (1962), which was sent to Venus.
