= List of future astronomical events =

A list of future observable astronomical events, of the classical variety: those seen by eyesight, or happen within the Solar System. These are by no means all events, but only the notable or rare ones. In particular, it does not include all solar eclipses or lunar eclipses unless otherwise notable, as they are far too numerous to list (see below for articles with lists of all these). Nor does it list astronomical events that have yet to be discovered. Some points of the list miss the last date of the events.

== 21st century ==
Date	Event
2027 February 6	Annular solar eclipse
2027 August 2	Total solar eclipse
2027 August 7	Asteroid (137108) 1999 AN10 will pass within 388,960 km (0.0026 AU) of Earth.
2028 January 12	Partial lunar eclipse
2028 January 26	Small annular solar eclipse
2028 July 22	A total solar eclipse will be visible across Australia, including Sydney, and New Zealand. Sydney will not see another total solar eclipse until June 3, 2858.
2028 October 26	Asteroid (35396) 1997 XF11 will pass 930,000 km (0.0062 AU) from the Earth.
2029	NASA's New Horizons spacecraft will exit the Kuiper Belt.
2029 April 13	Near-Earth asteroid (99942) Apophis will pass Earth at a relatively small distance of 31,200 km (19,400 mi) above Earth's surface, closer than some geosynchronous satellites.
2029 June 25	Total lunar eclipse. With an umbral eclipse magnitude of 1.84362, it will be the largest total lunar eclipse of the 21st century.
2029 December 20	Total lunar eclipse.
2030 June 1	An annular solar eclipse will be visible in Northern Africa, the Balkans, and Russia.
2030 November 25	A total solar eclipse will be seen in Southern Africa and Australia.
2031 May 7	Penumbral lunar eclipse
2031 May 20	Comet 55P/Tempel–Tuttle (source of the November Leonids) comes to perihelion.
2031 May 21	Annular solar eclipse
2031 June 5	Penumbral lunar eclipse
2031 October 30	Penumbral lunar eclipse
2031 November 14	Hybrid solar eclipse
2032 November 13	Transit of Mercury
2032	Projected return to Earth orbit of object J002E3, the discarded S-IVB third stage of the Apollo 12 Saturn V.
2033 October 8	Supermoon total lunar eclipse
2033 November 17	Expected Leonids outburst, which could produce up to 35-400 meteors per hour.
2034 March 20	Total solar eclipse
2034 April 3	Penumbral lunar eclipse
2034 September 12	Annular solar eclipse
2034 September 28	Partial lunar eclipse
2034 November 25	Exceptionally large supermoon
2036 April	A METI message Cosmic Call 2 sent from the 70-metre Eupatoria Planetary Radar on July 6, 2003, arrives at its destination, HIP 4872.
2036 March 27	The 99942 Apophis approach to Earth on March 27, 2036, will be no closer than 0.30889 AU (46.209 million km; 28.713 million mi; 120.21 LD).
2038 January 5	An annular solar eclipse will occur in the Caribbean Sea, Atlantic Ocean and western Africa.
2038 July 2	An annular solar eclipse will be visible in northern South America, the Atlantic Ocean and Africa.
2038 December 26	A solar eclipse will be seen in Australia and New Zealand.
2038 December	New Horizons passes 100 AU from the Sun.
2038	The next triple ring plane crossing of Saturn will occur.
2039 June 21	An annular solar eclipse will occur over the Northern Hemisphere.
2039 November 7	Transit of Mercury
2039 December 15	Total solar eclipse
2040 September 8	Planetary alignment of Mercury, Venus, Mars, Jupiter, Saturn and the crescent Moon
2040	The Great Red Spot on Jupiter's atmosphere will become circular according to calculations based on its reduction rate at present.
2043 April 9	A Non-Central Total Solar Eclipse will occur over Russia, the only Total Non-Central Eclipse this century.
2044 May	A METI message Cosmic Call 2 sent from the 70-metre Eupatoria Planetary Radar arrives at its destination, 55 Cancri.
2044 September	Another METI message Cosmic Call 2 sent from the 70-metre Eupatoria Planetary Radar arrives at its destination, HD 10307.
2044 October 1	Occultation of Regulus by Venus. The last was on July 7, 1959, and the next will occur on October 21, 3187, although some sources claim it will occur on October 6, 2271.
2047 July	A METI message called Teen Age Message sent from the 70-metre Eupatoria Planetary Radar will arrive at its destination, 47 UMa.
2048 February 29	There will be a rare full moon on a leap day; this event happens roughly once every century. The next full moon on a leap day will not occur until February 29, 2124.
2052 December 6	The closest supermoon of the century will occur.
2053 August 29	A Total Penumbral Lunar Eclipse will occur, the first since 2006.
2057	This year will see the very rare occurrence of two total solar eclipses in a single calendar year (on January 5 and December 26). The last time this occurred was 1889. The next time it will occur is 2252.
2060 October 22	Periodic comet 15P/Finlay will pass 0.0334 AU (5.00 million km; 3.10 million mi) from Earth.
2061 July 28	Halley's Comet reaches its perihelion, the closest point to the Sun—the last return reached its perihelion on February 9, 1986.
2062 May 10	Transit of Mercury.
2063	Triple conjunction Mars-Uranus.
2065 November 11	Transit of Mercury
2065 November 22	At 12:45 UTC, Venus will transit in front of Jupiter. It will be very difficult to observe from Earth, because the elongation of Venus and Jupiter from the Sun at this time will be only 7 degrees. This event will be the first occultation of a planet by another since January 3, 1818; however, the next will occur less than two years later, on July 15, 2067.
2066	Triple conjunction Jupiter-Uranus.
2067 July 15	At 11:56 UTC, Mercury will occult Neptune. This rare event will be very difficult to observe from Earth's surface, because of the constant low elongation of Mercury from the Sun, and the magnitude of Neptune always under the limit of visibility with the naked eye.
2067 October	A METI message Cosmic Call 1 sent from the 70-metre Eupatoria Planetary Radar arrives at its destination, HD 178428.
2069	A METI message, Cosmic Call 1, sent from the 70-metre Eupatoria Planetary Radar in 1999, arrives at its destination, 16 Cyg A.
2070 February	The Teen Age Message, an Active SETI message sent in 2001 from the 70-metre Eupatoria Planetary Radar, arrives at its destination, the star HD 197076.
2076 July	Dwarf planet 90377 Sedna will reach its perihelion of 76 AU from the Sun.
2079 August 11	Mercury occults Mars, the first since at least 1708.
2083	A star system known as "V Sagittae" is expected to go nova this year (+/- 11 years).
2084 November 10	Transit of Earth as seen from Mars, the first and the only one in this century.
2085 November 7	Transit of Mercury
2088 October 27	Mercury transits in front of Jupiter for the first time since 1708, but very close to the Sun and impossible to view with the naked eye.
2090 September 23	Total solar eclipse in the United Kingdom. The next total eclipse visible in the UK follows a track similar to that of August 11, 1999, but shifted slightly further north and occurring very near sunset. Maximum duration in Cornwall will be 2 minutes and 10 seconds. Same day and month as the eclipse of September 23, 1699.
2092	The trans-Neptunian object (523794) 2015 RR245 will make its closest approach to the Sun of 34 AU.
2094 April 7	Mercury occults Jupiter; it will be very close to the Sun and impossible to view with the naked eye.
2100 March 24	Polaris appears furthest North. Polaris' maximum apparent declination (taking account of nutation and aberration) will be 0.4526° from the celestial north pole.

== 22nd to 30th centuries ==
Date	Event
2113 August	The first time Pluto reaches aphelion since its discovery.
2114	Sedna overtakes Eris as the farthest-known planet-like object orbiting the Sun.
2117 December 11	Transit of Venus for the first time since 2012
2119 May 17	Periodic comet 144P/Kushida will pass about 0.049 AU (7.3 million km; 4.6 million mi; 19 LD) from Mars.
2123	Triple conjunction of Mars–Jupiter.
2123 June 9	Long-duration lunar eclipse of approximately 106.1 minutes.
2123 September 14	At 15:28 UTC, Venus will transit in front of Jupiter.
2125 December 8	Transit of Venus
2126 July 12	Comet Swift–Tuttle (source of the Perseids) comes to perihelion.
2126 July 29	At 16:08 UTC, Mercury will occult Mars.
2130 March 10	At 07:32 UTC, Sun passes through the Solar System barycenter.
2133 December 3	At 14:10 UTC, Mercury will transit in front Venus.
2134 March 27	Halley's Comet will be at perihelion during its following pass.
2134 May 7	Halley's Comet will get within 13.9 million km (8.6 million mi) of Earth.
2141 June 19	Long-duration lunar eclipse of about 106.1 minutes. This lunar eclipse is in the same Saros series (132) as the long lunar eclipse in 2123, and has an almost identical duration.
2143 January	Dwarf planet 90482 Orcus will come to perihelion 30.5 AU from the Sun.
2148	Triple conjunction Mars–Saturn
2150 June 25	Long duration (7 min 14 s) total solar eclipse, Solar Saros 139. The first "long" (> 7 min.) total solar eclipse since June 30, 1973.
2150 August 5	Main-belt asteroid 78 Diana (~125 km in diameter) will pass about 0.003 AU (450,000 km; 280,000 mi) from Earth threatening asteroid (29075) 1950 DA and perturb 1950 DA's long-term trajectory.
2151 June 14	A total solar eclipse will be visible from London. This will not happen again until May 5, 2600.
2161 May 19	All eight planets are predicted to be on the same side of the Sun, within 69 degrees.
2168 July 5	The largest total solar eclipse of the 3rd millennium, with an eclipse magnitude of 1.08074, lasting 7 minutes and 26 seconds exactly, saros 139.
2169 June–October	Triple conjunction of Saturn, Uranus and Neptune.
2170	Triple conjunction Mars–Jupiter.
2174	The second full orbit of Neptune around the Sun since its discovery in 1846.
2177	"First Plutonian anniversary" of Pluto's discovery, given its orbit is just under 248 Earth years.
2178 January 28	"First Plutonian anniversary" of Pluto's discovery, given its orbit is just under 248 Earth years.
2182 September 24	With an estimated probability of 0.04%, asteroid 101955 Bennu could hit Earth.
2185	Triple conjunction Mars–Saturn
2186 July 16	The longest total solar eclipse of the century. Lasting 7 min 29 s, it is 3 seconds shorter than the theoretical maximum, and is predicted to be the longest eclipse between 4000 BC and AD 6000 (eclipse predictions by Fred Espenak, NASA/GSFC.DEPP).
2187	Triple conjunction Mars–Saturn
2197 September 2	Venus occults Spica. Last occultation of Spica by Venus was on November 10, 1783.
2197 December 24	Earth's Moon will occult Neptune.
2209	Perihelion of Comet Halley. Previous perihelion passages were in 1986, 2061, and 2134.
2221 May 27	Near-Earth asteroid (285263) 1998 QE2 will pass Earth at a distance of 0.038 AU (5.7 million km; 3.5 million mi).
2221	Triple conjunction of Mars and Saturn
2223 December 2	At 12:39 UTC, Mars will transit in front of Jupiter, this comes after a gap of 836 Earth years.
2227	Pluto's orbit takes it closer to the Sun than Neptune.
2236 November 13	Simultaneous partial lunar eclipse and transit of Mercury, the first one since 1421 BC.
2238/2239	Triple conjunction of Jupiter and Saturn (whose last triple conjunction was in 1981).
2243 August 12	At 04:48 UTC, Venus will transit in front of Saturn.
2247 June 11	Transit of Venus
2250	The dwarf planet Orcus will have completed one orbit of the Sun since its discovery in 2004, based upon a barycentric orbital period of 246 Earth years.
2251 March 4	At 10:47 UTC, Venus will occult Uranus.
2253 August 1	Mercury occults Regulus (for the first time since August 13, 364 BC).
2255 June 9	Transit of Venus.
2257	Eris will reach perihelion (38 AU) from the Sun for the first time since discovery.
2265–2267	Predicted return to perihelion by the Great Comet of 1861 (C/1861 J1).
2271 October 6	Close conjunction between Venus and Regulus, perhaps occultation of Regulus by Venus.
2279	Triple conjunction of Jupiter and Saturn.
2279 October 21	At 15:32 UTC, Mercury will occult Neptune.
2281–82	Grand Trine of Uranus, Neptune, and Pluto. This last occurred in 1769 and 1770.
2283	C/1861 G1 (Thatcher) (source of the April Lyrids) is expected to come to perihelion.
2284	Perihelion of Comet Halley. Previous perihelion passages were in 1986, 2061, 2134, and 2209.
2287	C/1979 Y1 (Bradfield) (suspected source of the July Pegasids) is expected to come to perihelion.
2287 August 28	Closest perihelic opposition of Mars and Earth since August 27, 2003, at 55,688,405 km (34,603,170.6 mi; 0.372254 AU).
2288	The dwarf planet Quaoar will have completed one orbit of the Sun since its discovery in 2002, which, based upon current orbital measurements, gives it a period of 286 Earth years.
2293 February 3	At 08:43 UTC, Mercury will transit in front of Jupiter.
2307 September 11	At 22:23 UTC, Venus will occult Uranus.
2309 June 9	The longest total solar eclipse of the century, at 6 min 30 s.
2313	Triple conjunction Mars-Jupiter
2319	Triple conjunction Mars-Saturn.
2327 June 4	At 00:45 UTC, Venus will occult Mars.
2335 October 8	At 14:44 UTC, Venus will transit in front of Jupiter.
2351 April 7	At 17:15 UTC, Mercury will occult Uranus.
2360 December 13	Transit of Venus
2368 December 10	Transit of Venus.
2377 January 14	At 12:31 UTC, Mercury will transit in front of Jupiter.
2388	Triple conjunction Mars-Saturn
2391 May 11	Partial transit of Mercury
2400 November 17	Venus occults Antares (for the first time since September 17, 525 BC).
2410 November 2	At 09:22 UTC, Venus will occult Mars.
2419 December 30	At 01:25 UTC, Venus will occult Uranus
2426	Pluto completes the second orbit of the Sun since its discovery.
2435 March 3	At 19:11 UTC, Venus will transit in front of Saturn.
2442 October 23	At 09:43 UTC, Venus will transit in front of Jupiter.
2456	Triple conjunction Mars–Jupiter.
2475	Pluto's orbit brings it closer to the Sun than Neptune for the third time since its discovery.
2478 August 29	At 22:58 UTC, Mars will transit in front of Jupiter.
2487–2719	Fragments (A–D) of the Great Comet of 1882 should return.
2487 May 9	At 12:45 UTC, Mercury will occult Mars.
2490 June 12	Transit of Venus
2492 May 6	Belgian astronomer Jean Meeus asserts that the orbits of all eight planets and Pluto will be within the same 90° arc of the Solar System. The last time this is believed to have occurred was on February 1, 949.
2498 June 10	Transit of Venus.
2515 April 7	At 10:37 UTC, Mars will occult Neptune.
2518 January 25	At 22:41 UTC, Venus will transit in front of Saturn
2548 October 29	At 22:52 UTC, Jupiter will occult Uranus.
2562	The dwarf planet Eris will have completed one orbit of the Sun since its discovery in 2005.
2599	Triple conjunction Mars–Jupiter.
2600 May 5	First total solar eclipse visible from London since 2151. Its path is predicted to be exceptionally wide at its maximum point.
2603 December 16	Transit of Venus
2608 May 13	Grazing transit of Mercury
2611 December 13	Partial transit of Venus
2626/2627	Triple conjunction Mars-Saturn
2629	Triple conjunction Mars-Saturn
2633	Possible that the C/2011 W3 (Lovejoy) could come back after reaching its perihelion in 2011.
2649 February 16	At 10:50 UTC, Venus will occult Neptune.
2650 September 3	The distance between Mars and the Earth will reach a new minimum of 55,651,582.118 km. It will be a slightly closer encounter by perihelic opposition (by 37,000 km) than the previous one of August 28, 2287. The following closer encounter will be on September 8, 2729.
2655/2656	Triple conjunction Jupiter-Saturn
2663	Triple conjunction Mars-Saturn
2674	Pluto completes the third orbit of the Sun since its discovery.
2678 July 5	At 18:46 UTC, Venus will occult Pluto.
2699–2700	Three triple conjunctions occur within two years, between Mars-Jupiter, Mars-Neptune and Jupiter-Neptune.
2723	Pluto's orbit brings it closer to the Sun than Neptune for the fourth time since its discovery.
2729 September 8	The distance between Mars and Earth will arrive at a new minimum, at 55,651,033.122 km. It will be a closer encounter of perihelic opposition, slightly shorter (by 549 km) than the previous one of September 3, 2650.
2732 October 24	At 07:38 UTC, Venus will occult Uranus.
2733 June 15	Transit of Venus
2741 June 13	Transit of Venus
2742	Triple conjunction Mars–Jupiter
2744	Triple conjunction Mars–Jupiter
2761	Triple conjunction Mars–Saturn
2781 December 3	At 06:04 UTC, Venus will occult Neptune.
2791	Triple conjunction Mars–Jupiter
2794 / 2795	Triple conjunction Jupiter–Saturn
2800–99	Fragments A+B of Comet Ikeya–Seki (with orbital periods of around 800–950 years) are expected to return. It last came to perihelion in 1965.
2816 March 25	At 15:04 UTC, Mercury will transit in front of Jupiter.
2817 March 6	At 08:53 UTC, Venus will transit in front of Saturn.
2818 April 11	At 19:58 UTC, Mercury will occult Mars.
2825 February 6	At 09:58 UTC, Mars will occult Uranus.
2829/2830	Triple conjunction Mars-Saturn.
2830 December 15	At 06:52 UTC, Venus will occult Mars.
2833 July 20	At 04:29 UTC, Mercury will transit in front of Jupiter.
2842/2843	Triple conjunction Mars-Jupiter
2846 December 16	Transit of Venus
2854 December 14	Partial transit of Venus
2855 July 20	At 05:15 UTC, Mercury will transit in front of Jupiter.
2866	Triple conjunction Mars-Saturn
2866 March 9	At 04:36 UTC, Mars will transit in front of Saturn.
2880 March 16	Predicted possible impact date for asteroid (29075) 1950 DA, a near-Earth object with a 1-in-8,300 (0.012%) chance of impact.
2912 February 12	At 20:03 UTC, Venus will transit in front of Jupiter.
2954 November 8	At 01:47 UTC, Venus will transit in front of Jupiter.
2954 November 21	At 00:56 UTC, Mercury will transit in front of Saturn.
2959 March 9	At 16:35 UTC, Mars will transit in front of Jupiter.
2965 October 5	At 15:48 UTC, Mercury will transit in front of Jupiter.
2986 August 13	At 08:05 UTC, Venus will transit in front of Jupiter.
2991 March 22	At 13:40 UTC, Venus will occult Neptune.
3000	Due to the precession of the equinoxes, Gamma Cephei becomes the north star.

== Long solar eclipses in 3rd millennium ==
Eclipse	Type	Duration	Saros no.
August 2, 2027	Total	6 min 23 s	Solar Saros 136
January 26, 2028	Annular	10 min 27 s	Solar Saros 141
August 12, 2045	Total	6 min 06 s	Solar Saros 136
February 5, 2046	Annular	9 min 42 s	Solar Saros 141
August 24, 2063	Total	5 min 49 s	Solar Saros 136
February 17, 2064	Annular	8 min 56 s	Solar Saros 141
May 11, 2078	Total	5 min 40 s	Solar Saros 139
November 4, 2078	Annular	8 min 29 s	Solar Saros 144
May 22, 2096	Total	6 min 07 s	Solar Saros 139
November 15, 2096	Annular	8 min 53 s	Solar Saros 144
December 8, 2113	Annular	9 min 35 s	Solar Saros 134
June 3, 2114	Total	6 min 32 s	Solar Saros 139
December 19, 2131	Annular	10 min 14 s	Solar Saros 134
June 13, 2132	Total	6 min 55 s	Solar Saros 139
December 30, 2149	Annular	10 min 42 s	Solar Saros 134
June 25, 2150	Total	7 min 14 s	Solar Saros 139 (Note: Exceeding 7 minutes of totality, this will be the first time this has happened in 177 years; the last one occurred on June 30, 1973, when the Concorde prototype followed the totality spot for 73 minutes.)
January 10, 2168	Annular	10 min 55 s	Solar Saros 134
July 5, 2168	Total	7 min 26 s	Solar saros 139 (Note: Largest total solar eclipse in the 3rd millennium, with a magnitude of 1.08074)
January 20, 2186	Annular	10 min 53 s	Solar Saros 134
July 16, 2186	Total	7 min 29 s (Note: Very close to the theoretical maximum.)	Solar Saros 139 (Note: "Crowning" this series. This is predicted to be the longest eclipse during the current 10,000-year period, from 4000 BC to 6000 AD (eclipse predictions by Fred Espenak, NASA/GSFC.DEPP).)
July 27, 2204	Total	7 min 22 s	Solar Saros 139
August 8, 2222	Total	7 min 06 s	Solar Saros 139
August 18, 2240	Total	6 min 40 s	Solar Saros 139
May 7, 2255	Total	6 min 22 s	Solar Saros 142
August 29, 2258	Total	6 min 09 s	Solar Saros 139
May 17, 2273	Total	6 min 31 s	Solar Saros 142
May 28, 2291	Total	6 min 34 s	Solar Saros 142 (Note: "Crowning" this series.)
June 9, 2309	Total	6 min 30 s	Solar Saros 142
June 20, 2327	Total	6 min 21 s	Solar Saros 142
June 30, 2345	Total	6 min 07 s	Solar Saros 142
July 12, 2363	Total	5 min 51 s	Solar Saros 142
July 22, 2381	Total	5 min 33 s	Solar Saros 142
August 2, 2399	Total	5 min 14 s	Solar Saros 142
April 20, 2414	Total	5 min 33 s	Solar Saros 145 (Note: The series from the last total eclipse of the last millennium taken on August 11, 1999.)
April 30, 2432	Total	5 min 56 s	Solar Saros 145
May 12, 2450	Total	6 min 19 s	Solar Saros 145
May 22, 2468	Total	6 min 41 s	Solar Saros 145
June 2, 2486	Total	6 min 59 s	Solar Saros 145
June 14, 2504	Total	7 min 10 s	Solar Saros 145
June 25, 2522	Total	7 min 12 s	Solar Saros 145 (Note: "Crowning" this series.)
July 5, 2540	Total	7 min 04 s	Solar Saros 145
July 17, 2558	Total	6 min 43 s	Solar Saros 145
August 6, 2567	Total	6 min 26 s	Solar Saros 164
August 16, 2585	Total	6 min 16 s	Solar Saros 164
August 28, 2603	Total	6 min 02 s	Solar Saros 164
September 8, 2621	Total	5 min 45 s	Solar Saros 164
September 19, 2639	Total	5 min 28 s	Solar Saros 164
May 17, 2645	Total	5 min 17 s	Solar Saros 148
September 29, 2657	Total	5 min 11 s	Solar saros 164
May 29, 2663	Total	5 min 07 s	Solar Saros 148
June 28, 2671	Total	5 min 07 s	Solar Saros 157
July 9, 2689	Total	5 min 31 s	Solar Saros 157
July 21, 2707	Total	5 min 48 s	Solar Saros 157
July 31, 2725	Total	5 min 57 s	Solar Saros 157 (Note: "Crowning" this series.)
August 12, 2743	Total	5 min 56 s	Solar Saros 157
July 31, 2744	Total	5 min 59 s	Solar Saros 167
August 12, 2762	Total	6 min 11 s	Solar Saros 167
August 22, 2780	Total	6 min 16 s	Solar saros 167 (Note: "Crowning" this series.)
September 2, 2798	Total	6 min 14 s	Solar Saros 167
May 21, 2813	Total	6 min 11 s	Solar Saros 170
June 1, 2831	Total	6 min 39 s	Solar Saros 170
June 12, 2849	Total	7 min 00 s	Solar Saros 170
June 23, 2867	Total	7 min 10 s	Solar Saros 170
July 3, 2885	Total	7 min 11 s	Solar Saros 170 (Note: "Crowning" this series.)
July 16, 2903	Total	7 min 04 s	Solar Saros 170
July 26, 2921	Total	6 min 50 s	Solar Saros 170
August 6, 2939	Total	6 min 33 s	Solar Saros 170
August 16, 2957	Total	6 min 13 s	Solar Saros 170
August 28, 2975	Total	5 min 53 s	Solar Saros 170
September 7, 2993	Total	5 min 33 s	Solar Saros 170

== 4th to 8th millennia ==
Date	Event
3089 December 18	First transit of Venus which is not part of a pair since November 23, 1396.
3332 December 20	Transit of Venus
c. 3600	The expected return of Comet Donati that last appeared in 1858.
3711–12	Multi-triple conjunction between Jupiter, Saturn, Uranus and Neptune.
3973 July 13	At 18:54:49 UTC a long (7 min 12 s) total solar eclipse.
3991 July 25	At 02:29:22 UTC a long (7 min 18 s) total solar eclipse.
4009 August 4	At 10:00:56 UTC a long (7 min 12 s) total solar eclipse.
4285 August 6	Venus occults Regulus.
4296 November 22	Venus occults Antares.
4385	Comet Hale–Bopp is expected to return to the inner Solar System. It last dominated the skies of Earth in 1996–97.
4557 November 10	Venus occults Regulus.
4747 August 14	Venus occults Regulus.
c. 4785	The Great Comet of 1811 (with a 1.38 year observation arc) may return.
4903 June 29	At 08:55:01 UTC a long (7 min 0 s) total solar eclipse.
4921 August 8	At 16:28:39 UTC a long (7 min 3 s) total solar eclipse.
5001 September 11	Mercury occults Regulus.
c. 5200	Due to axial precession, ι Cephei will replace the previous target, γ Cephei, as Earth's northern pole star (the next naked eye North star will be Deneb, c.9800).
5366 August 27	Venus occults Aldebaran, the first occultation of Aldebaran by a planet since July 15, 18,980 BC.
5898 August 30	Venus occults Regulus.
5963 August 16	Longest hybrid solar eclipse between 4000 BC and 6000 AD occurs, lasting 1 minute and 52 seconds. It is of Solar Saros 267.
5974 September 25	Mercury occults Regulus.
6212 November 7	Mercury occults Regulus.
6587 September 9	Venus occults Regulus.
6727 August 25	Mars occults Regulus for the first time since June 28, 17,619 BCE. Despite the over 24,300-year wait, it will happen three more times over the next 677 years.
6757 July 5	There is anticipated to be a simultaneous partial solar eclipse and transit of Mercury, the first such simultaneous eclipse and planetary transit in recorded history.
7541 February 16	Jupiter occults Saturn (the first time since prehistoric times, and the first of a double row in a year, the only occurrence of this for perhaps at least a million years). The first event is a transit (partial), the second event is an occultation (total).
7541 June 17	Jupiter occults Saturn (the first time since prehistoric times, and the first of a double row in a year, the only occurrence of this for perhaps at least a million years). The first event is a transit (partial), the second event is an occultation (total).
c. 7800	Dwarf planet 90377 Sedna passes its aphelion in the decades around the year 7800 AD.

== 9th and 10th millennia ==
All these dates are in a uniform time scale such as Terrestrial Time. When converted to our ordinary solar time or Universal Time, which is decidedly non-uniform, via ΔT, the dates would be about one day earlier. Because of this difference, these dates have no anniversary relation to historical dates and should not be linked to them. Furthermore, they are only astronomical dates, so they are given in the astronomical format of Year Month Day, which allows them to be ordered.

Date	Event
8007 October 5	Venus occults Aldebaran.
8018 December 30	Venus occults Regulus.
8059 July 20	Simultaneous annular solar eclipse and transit of Mercury.
8136 September 6	Mercury occults Aldebaran.
8183 October 26	Mercury occults Regulus.
8192 October 3	Venus occults Regulus.
8362 December 7	Mercury occults Regulus.
8444 October 18	Mars occults Regulus.
8492 October 30	Mercury occults Regulus.
8674 February 25	Jupiter occults Saturn. This event is a transit (partial).
8775 October 27	Mars occults Regulus.
8881 October 14	Venus occults Regulus.
8971 September 23	Mercury occults Aldebaran.
9106 November 5	Venus occults Regulus.
9168 November 21	Mean solar time and atomic time will be two days apart.
9361 August 4	Simultaneous annular solar eclipse and transit of Mercury
9622 February 4	Simultaneous annular solar eclipse and transit of Mercury
9682 November 16	Mercury occults Regulus.
c. 9800	Earth's roughly 26,000-year route of axial precession returns to Deneb as the North star.
9847 November 21	Mars occults Regulus.
9966 August 11	Simultaneous total solar eclipse and transit of Mercury

== After 10,000 AD ==
Extremely rare or remarkable astronomical events in the years after the beginning of the 11th millennium AD (Year 10,000).

Date / Years from now	Event
August 20, 10,663 AD	A simultaneous total solar eclipse and transit of Mercury.
10,720 years	The planets Mercury and Venus will both cross the ecliptic at the same time.
August 25, 11,268 AD	A simultaneous total solar eclipse and transit of Mercury
February 28, 11,575 AD	A simultaneous annular solar eclipse and transit of Mercury.
September 17, 13,425 AD	A near-simultaneous transit of Venus and Mercury.
13,727 years	Vega becomes the North Star.
April 5, 15,232 AD	A simultaneous total solar eclipse and transit of Venus.
April 20, 15,790 AD	A simultaneous annular solar eclipse and transit of Mercury.
14,000 – 17,000 years	Canopus becomes the South Star, but it will only be within 10° of the south celestial pole.
20,346 years	Thuban becomes the North Star.
27,800 years	Polaris again is the North Star.
27,000 years	The eccentricity of Earth's orbit will reach a minimum, 0.00236 (it is now 0.01671).
70,000 years	Estimated time for Comet Hyakutake to return to the inner Solar System, after having travelled in its orbit out to its aphelion 3410 A.U. from the Sun and back.
93,830 years	Sirius becomes once again the South Star, but at 2.3° of the south celestial pole.
~100,000 years	Estimated time for Red hypergiant star VY Canis Majoris to become a supernova.
100,000 - 400,000 years	Estimated time for Red supergiant star Betelgeuse to become a supernova. For a few months, the explosions should be easily visible on Earth in daylight.
100,000 - 140,000 years	Estimated time for Red supergiant star Antares to become a supernova. For a few months, the explosions should be easily visible on Earth in daylight.
250,000 - 558,000 years	Next simultaneous occurrence of a transit of Venus and a transit of Earth as observable from Mars. Estimated time for Comet West to return to the inner solar system. It last passed by in 1976.
~300,000 years	Estimated time for Wolf-Rayet star WR 104 to become a supernova. There is a small chance that WR 104 is spinning fast enough to produce a gamma-ray burst (GRB), and an even smaller chance that such a GRB could pose a threat to life on Earth.
461,000 years	The eccentricity of Earth's orbit will reach a break minimum, 0.001897 (it is now 0.01671).
2,056,000 years	The eccentricity of Earth's orbit will reach a break minimum, 0.000765 (it is now 0.01671).
3,481,000 years	The eccentricity of Earth's orbit will reach a maximum 0.06 (it is now 0.01671).
6 million years	Estimated time for Comet C/1999 F1 (Catalina), one of the longest period comets known to return to the inner Solar System, after having travelled in its orbit out to its aphelion 66,600 AU (1.053 light-years) from the Sun and back.
7,774,000 years	The eccentricity of Earth's orbit will reach a break minimum, 0.000463 (it is now 0.01671).
7,929,000 years	The eccentricity of Earth's orbit will reach a maximum 0.061342 (it is now 0.01671).
9,138,000 years	The obliquity of Earth's orbit will reach a minimum, below 22° (it is now 23.44°).
14,128,000 years	The obliquity of Earth's orbit will reach a minimum, 21.86° (it is now 23.44°).
100 - 300 million years	Estimated time for Saturn's rings to disappear.
~1.9 billion years	Estimated time for white dwarf component of IK Pegasi star system to become a supernova.
~6.2 billion years	Estimated time for white dwarf component of Wolf 1130 star system to become a supernova.

== See also ==
- Lists of solar eclipses
- Lists of lunar eclipses
- Occultation
- Triple conjunction
- List of future calendar events
- Timeline of the far future
