= A Simple Response to an Elemental Message =

2016 Interstellar Radio Message (IRM)

- Date: 20:00 UTC, 10 October 2016
- Duration: 434 light year journey
- Location: Cebreros Station (DSA 2); 40°27′9.68″N 4°22′3.18″W
- Type: interstellar transmission
- Organised by: University of Edinburgh, UK European Space Agency, DE UK Astronomy Technology Centre; Royal Observatory Edinburgh, UK European Southern Observatory, DE Johns Hopkins University, US University of Potsdam, DE Saint Mary's University, Halifax, CA Instituto de Astrofísica de Canarias
- Participants: 3,775 participants from 146 countries
- Website: www.asimpleresponse.org

A Simple Response to an Elemental Message (ASREM) was an Interstellar Radio Message (IRM) consisting primarily of 3775 worldwide responses to this initiative's posed question; "How will our present, environmental interactions shape the future?" This transmission also features a smaller 'Honorary Mention' text archive and a series of images of Earth.

This interstellar "message in a bottle" was transmitted on 10 October 2016, at 20:00 UTC by the European Space Agency Cebreros (DSA2) deep-space tracking station towards Polaris; the Pole Star which is approximately 434 light years (133 parsecs) from Earth. The IRM consisted of a single 27,653,733 byte, 866 second transmission.

== Concept and plan overview ==
The not-for-profit ASREM initiative was devised and produced by artist Paul Quast in collaboration with the UK Astronomy Technology Centre, European Space Agency and the University of Edinburgh along with researchers working at the Johns Hopkins University and also the European Southern Observatory.

Unlike other IRM, the transmission's stated purpose was devised for a terrestrial, 'overview effect' application; "to look at our civilisation's past, present and future environmental interactions on Earth by using light's 'round trip' from our planet's Pole Star as a symbolic and temporal odyssey". This initiative's narrative examined the 'Critical Decade' (2010-2020); a pivotal point within our civilisation's history proposed by a series of climate researchers in which present ecological decisions may irreversibly commit future generations to adversity. The worldwide public were challenged to consider their role within shaping the planet's future biosphere in the newly defined Anthropocene era while also considering approaches which may be adopted to resolve climatic/biological concerns faced on Earth today.

The research purpose of this initiative and its publicly generated material (besides its resonant legacy travelling through space) was outlined by its authors as: "the submitted content was also accumulated to contribute to ongoing dialogue on how our civilisation collectively foresees its role within shaping Earth's future biosphere and provide a means to analyse these perspectives for cross-cultural universals between nations within further academic research." An initial analysis of this submitted material has already provided a number of insights into the noösphere of participating countries with further examinations currently ongoing.

As well as providing engagement with the worldwide public on these pertinent concerns, a number of climate scientists and astronomers also contributed to this initiative; submitting perspectives gained from their various fields of research conducted within Antarctica, the Arctic and other research facilities located around the world.

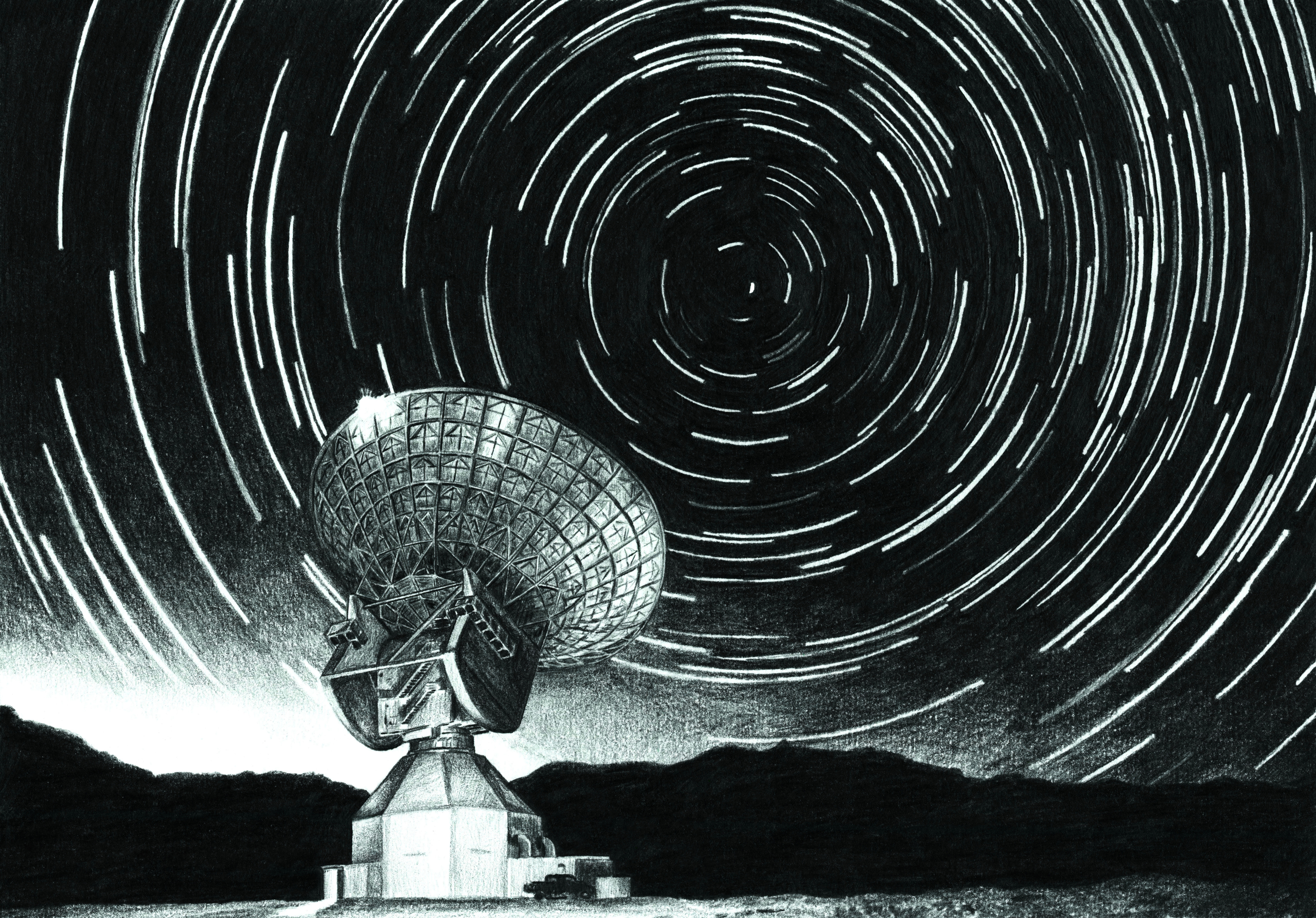
A Simple Response Press Image

== Target ==
The organisers of this transmission stated that Polaris α UMi Aa was chosen "due to the cultural iconography this star possesses, its tangible links to the transmissions stated ecological narrative and the possibility to provide a contemporary, environmental chapter to the Pole Star's symbology". In Greek, the star was known as the Cynosure (original; Kynosoura), a title which later entered the English language to denote "an object that serves as a focal point of attention and admiration" or "something that serves to guide".

The Polaris planetary system, even if it exists, may not be suited for life, because it is a supergiant type F7Ib star in a triple star system [with nearby companions] which should (to present knowledge) possess very powerful stellar winds around its vicinity. In addition to this, the age of Polaris has been calculated to be approximately 70 million years and thus this star may be too young to support the development of life. Another IRM entitled Across the Universe was previously sent towards this stellar location by NASA's nearby MDSCC facility in 2008.

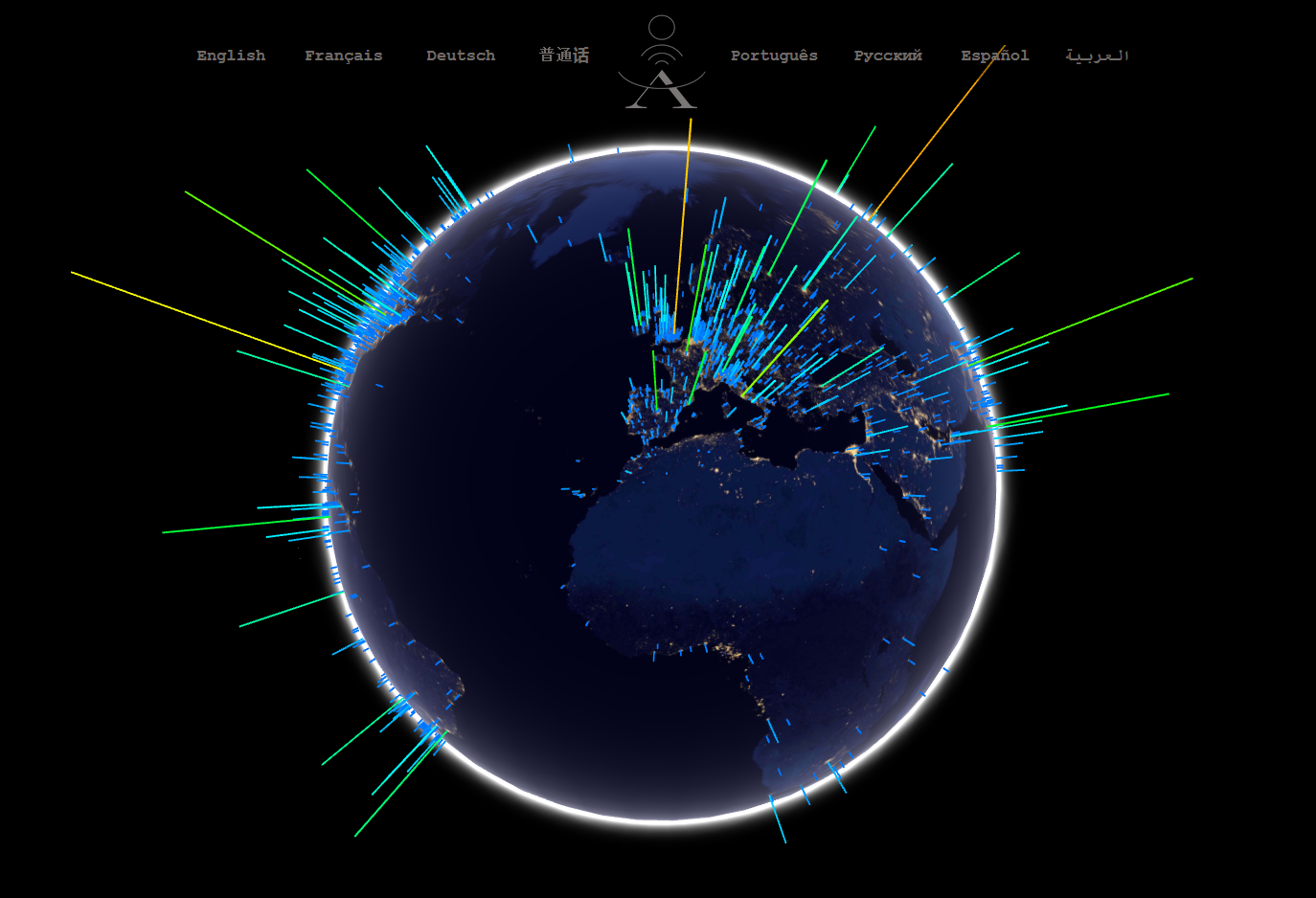
Globe depicting transmission contributors

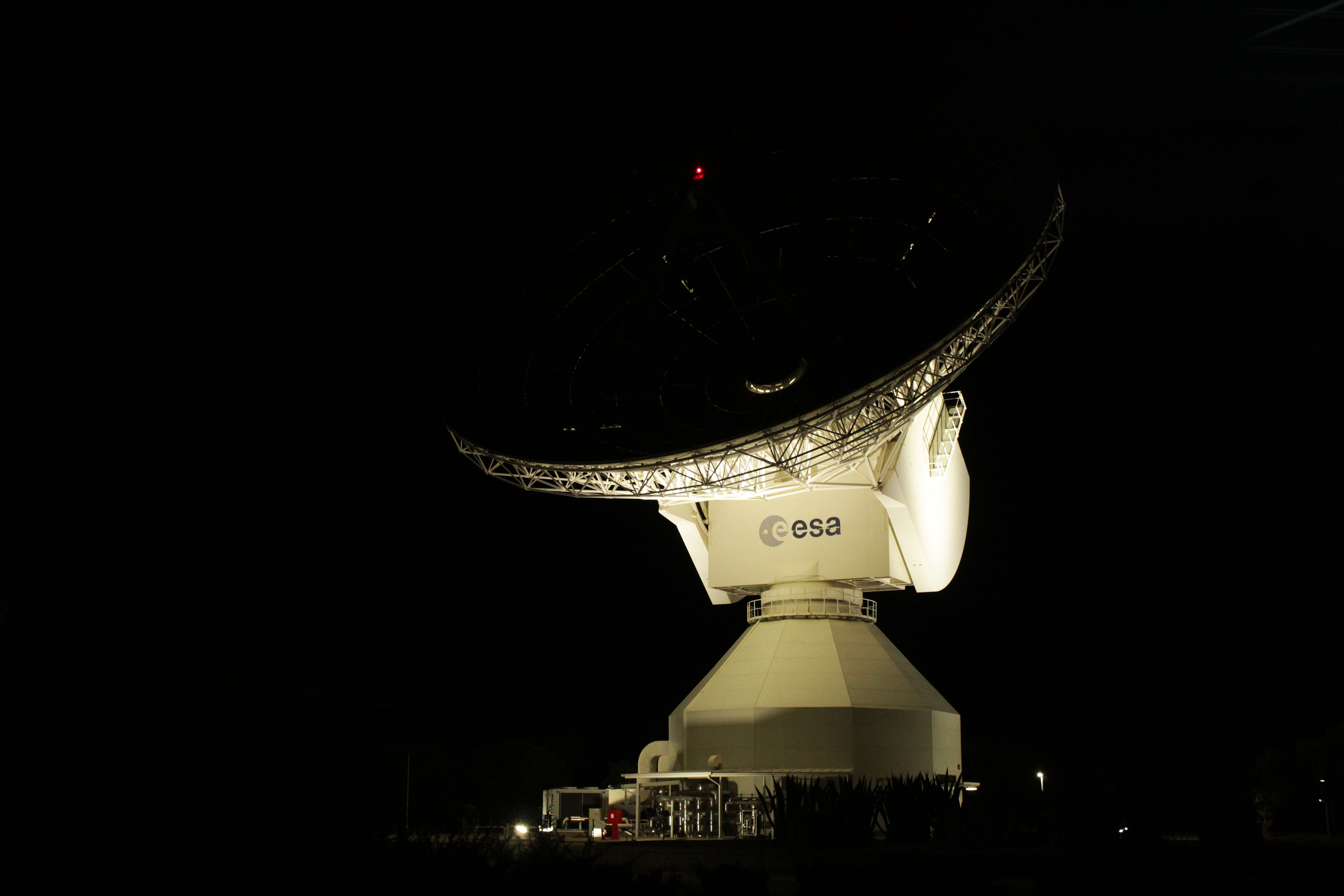
Cebreros Deep Space Tracking Station, 10th Oct

== Message components ==
This transmission consisted of four components in the order; AM → IMAGES → AM → IMAGES → AM → MES → HM

- (AM) The Arecibo message was included at intervals to serve as a Rosetta Stone template.
- (IMAGES) The ASREM image archive consisted of 70 open-source photographs which were chosen to be reflective of this initiative's ecological purpose. Images were rendered into frequency-modulated files using binary frequency-shift keying, a format that utilises universal laws of mathematics to render a two-dimensional canvas which was initially developed by Dr. Frank Drake et al. for the Arecibo message [AM]) in 1974. While the cardinality of 1,679 was chosen for the Arecibo message because it is a semiprime (product of two prime numbers), to be arranged rectangularly as 73 rows by 23 columns, the ASREM initiative rendered all transmitted images in a more complex cardinality of 381,851, to be arranged as 383 rows by 997 columns.
- (MES) ASREM messages submitted by the worldwide public in response to the question; "How will our present, environmental interactions shape the future?" Initially, responses were limited to 156 characters which was subsequently lifted to accept the proportion of statements, proverbs, poetry and satirical messages submitted. In total, 4,203 messages were submitted, of which 3,775 were deemed to address this posed question and thus became the transmission's main content. These 3,775 messages were submitted by individuals from 146 countries in 16 different languages. The file was wrapped into a UTF-8 format before being encoded into binary with no particular emphasis placed upon the content's potential to be deciphered by possible intercepting extraterrestrial intelligence (ETI) [due to the character range and potential for interpretation]. This assumed range has been estimated to exceed 520 unique characters. The authors of this initiative have expressed intention that these contents are "created by Earth's inhabitants for Earth's inhabitants"; providing the possibility for advancing planetary perspective, stewardship and communal discourse on ecological issues.
- (HM) The Honorary Mention archive contains inspirational and iconic quotes related to this initiative's purpose, submitted by individuals around the world. In total, 81 quotes by individuals such as Carl Sagan, Yuri Gagarin, Mahatma Gandhi, Paul Crutzen, Patrick Moore, Al Worden, Ban Ki-moon and Koko the gorilla were included and encoded in a similar fashion to the ASREM contributions.

While the transmission may be intercepted by an ETI en route to Polaris, besides the image archive, the contents may not be decipherable. In addition to this, the transmission rate was very high, ~256 kbit/s at a transmitting power of 19.953 kW. This transmission was also the last initiative to utilise the frequency of 7168.0089310 MHz, the bandwidth formerly dedicated to ESA's Rosetta Mission.

== Potential dangers and detectability ==
While this transmission was primarily developed to advance an 'overview effect' perspective, the initiative also served to reignite debate on the benefits, dangers and ethics of transmitting into interstellar space. Days prior to the transmission on 10 October, the British theoretical physicist Stephen Hawking reiterated his concerns for contacting ETI, specifically regarding aliens' deportment. Days later, SETI scientists Seth Shostak and Douglas Vakoch presented their own individual perspectives on this subject and the greater challenges facing any potential continuation of Active SETI/METI activities.

In a 2016 article, Douglas Vakoch, President of METI International, addressed the ASREM initiative and its relationship to themes highlighted within SETI's 'Earth Speaks', stating;

"One of the strongest themes we see in 'Earth Speaks' is a concern with our current environmental crisis. In answering the question 'How will our present environmental interactions shape the future?' we need to reflect on what it will take to sustain Earth's civilization in the coming centuries. That can only be a good thing.".

In addition to this, scientists from the Teen Age Message (2001), Cosmic Call (1999 & 2003) and Lone Signal (2013) IRM initiatives were also consulted and aided in advising on this transmission. Aleksandr Zaitsev, an expert in interstellar radio communication and Chief Scientist of the Radio Engineering and Electronics Institute of the Russian Academy of Science, pointed out the futility of choosing Polaris as a target considering it is a supergiant star with relatively poor potential to host alien life.

Numerous climate scientists and SETI researchers were consulted during production of this interstellar initiative, all of which possessed shared or differing opinions on the use of an IRM time capsule to support an ecological endeavour. However, all researchers generally agreed upon the volatile nature of Earth's contemporary environment and the need to raise awareness and action to avert ecological crises.

== Public reception & project timeline ==
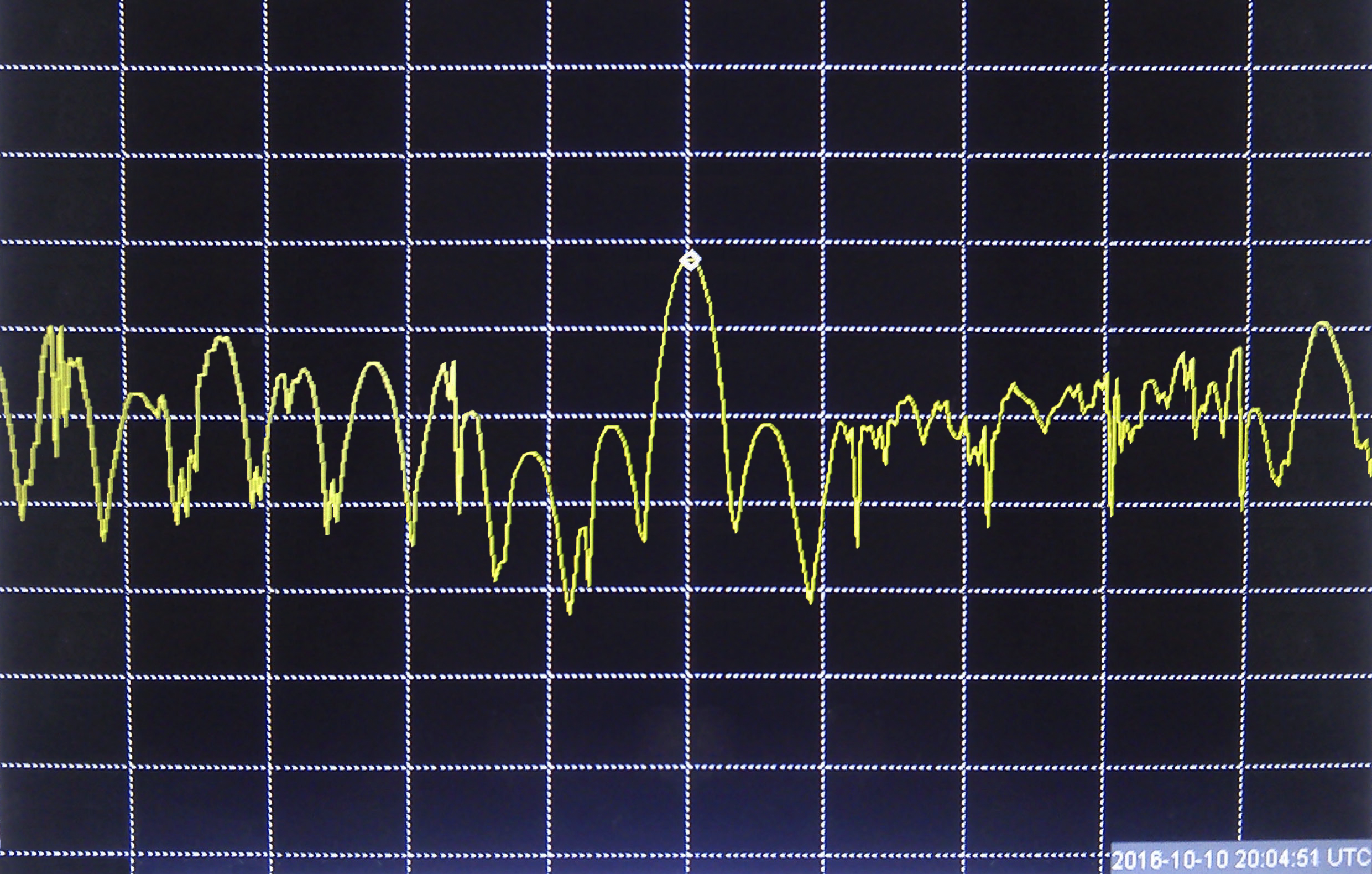
Uplink of 7168.0089310 MHz ASREM signal, depicted on Cebreros console

ASREM (English version) initially launched on 30 November 2015 to coincide with the United Nations COP21 Climate Conference in Paris. It gained a large number of submissions over the duration of this summit before launching additional language options in February 2016 (German, Spanish, Portuguese, French). Subsequently, the initiative enticed further global contributions when the Russian, Mandarin and Arabic interfaces launched and again prior to the open-call end. In total, the initiative attained 3,775 contributions to the ASREM archive and 81 'Honorary mentions' quotes from 146 countries in 16 languages with over 500,000 unique visitors to the website. A number of articles by global journals also discussed and examined the objectives of this initiative, all of which provided further public engagement with this interstellar time capsule.
