= Teen Age Message =

Series of interstellar radio transmissions

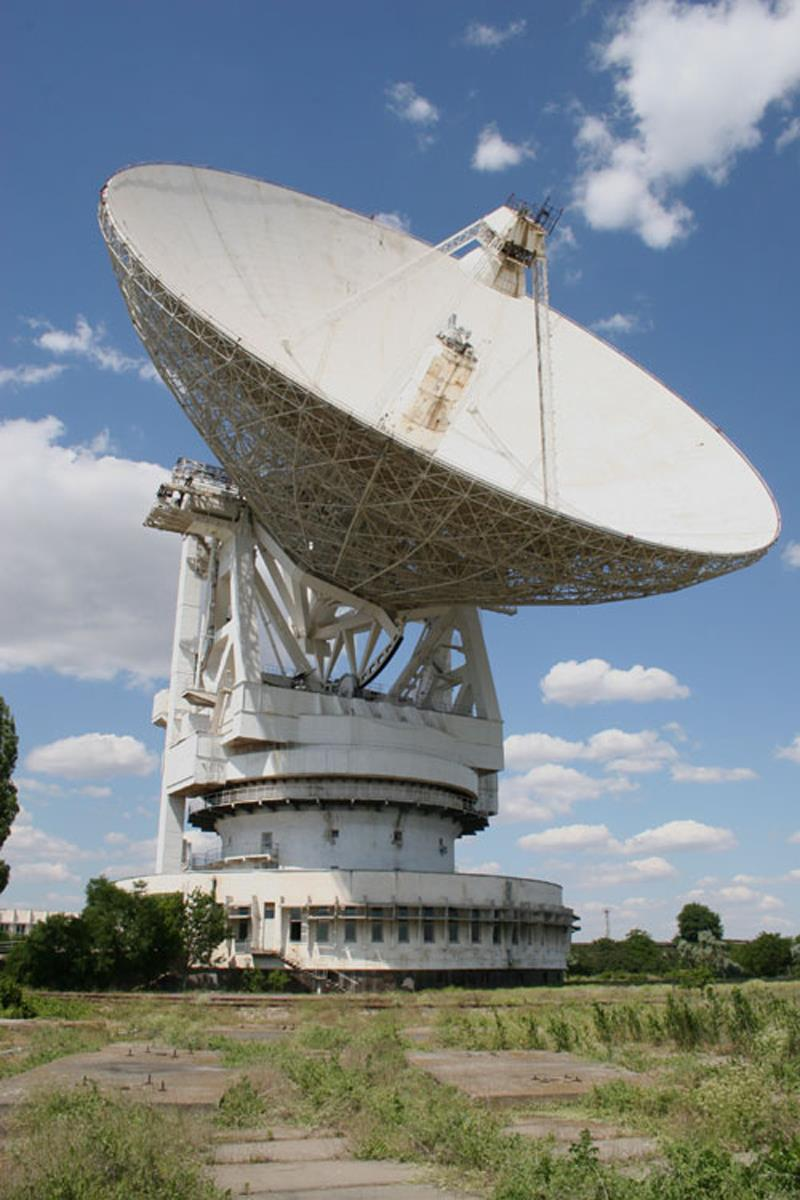
- Yevpatoria 70-m dish P-2500
- Date: August 29, 2001– September 4, 2001
- Location: Yevpatoria Planetary Radar, Yevpatoria, Crimea, Ukraine
- Participants: Alexander Zaitsev et al.

The Teen Age Message (TAM) was a series of interstellar radio transmissions sent from the Yevpatoria Planetary Radar to six solar-type stars during August–September 2001. The structure of the TAM was suggested by Alexander Zaitsev, Chief Scientist at Russia's Institute of Radio-engineering and Electronics. The message's content and target stars were selected by a group of teens from four Russian cities, who collaborated in person and via the Internet. Each transmission comprised three sections: a sounding, a live theremin concert, and digital data including images and text. TAM was humanity's fourth Active SETI broadcast and the first musical interstellar radio message.

== Overview ==
Zaitsev's proposal for a musical message – the "First Theremin Concert for Extraterrestrials" – was submitted to the Arecibo Observatory in July 2000. It was rejected amid concerns over the dangers posed by advertising the presence of humanity to unknown and possibly highly advanced civilizations. After another unsuccessful attempt to garner support, the project was backed by the Yevpatoria RT-70 radio telescope with funding from the Education Department of Moscow. Unlike the previous digital-only messages Arecibo-1974 and Cosmic Call 1, TAM had a three-part structure, each containing different forms of information. Such structure was suggested by Alexander Zaitsev, and was intended to make the message easier to detect and interpret. The three elements of each transmission were:

1. A coherent sounding signal with slow Doppler wavelength tuning to imitate transmission from the Sun's center. This signal was transmitted in order to help extraterrestrials detect the TAM and diagnose the radio propagation effect of the interstellar medium.
2. Analog sound output from a theremin. This electric musical instrument produces a quasi-sinusoidal signal which is easily extracted from background noise. There were seven musical compositions in the "First Theremin Concert for Extraterrestrials".
3. Binary digital information similar to the Arecibo message, including the logotype of TAM, written greetings in Russian and English, and artistic drawings. This section and the concert program were composed by teens from different parts of Russia.

== Theremin concert ==
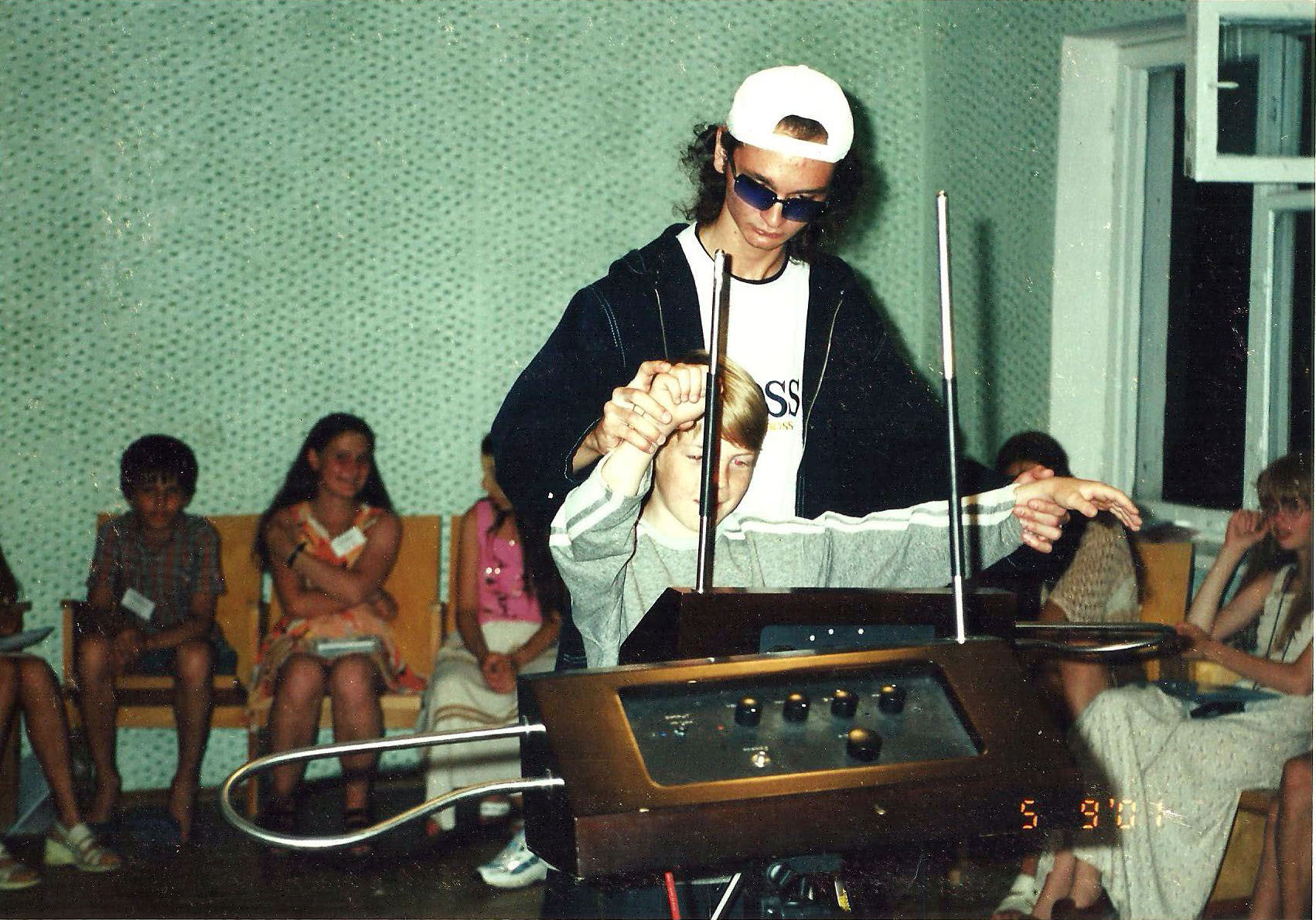
Thereminist Anton Kershenko and a young student perform in the "First Theremin Concert for Extraterrestrials" in 2001, with music transmitted to space.

According to Zaitsev, art must be central to any interstellar message. Physical laws and mathematics are almost certainly already known to extraterrestrial intelligences, but our artwork is unique to us. With this in mind, and in contrast to previous binary digital broadcasts, Zatsev proposed "not a discrete two-tone radio signal but a more native continuous one, in which smooth frequency variations directly transfer one-dimensional emotional information. I am talking about music, which is more universally comprehensible than language, and about theremin, which is an electronic noncontact musical instrument."

Three theremin performers from the Moscow Theremin Center – Lydia Kavina, Yana Aksenova, and Anton Kerchenko – were invited to perform seven songs selected by students. The program included two Russian folk songs and works by Beethoven, Vivaldi, Saint-Saëns, Rakhmaninov, and Gershwin. Kavina submitted recordings of her performance, but Aksenova and Kerchenko performed live – the radar dish had been specially modified to accept input from theremins. Each performance lasted about fifteen minutes. The First Theremin Concert for Extraterrestrials was the world's first musical Active SETI broadcast, and was sent seven years before NASA's Across the Universe message.

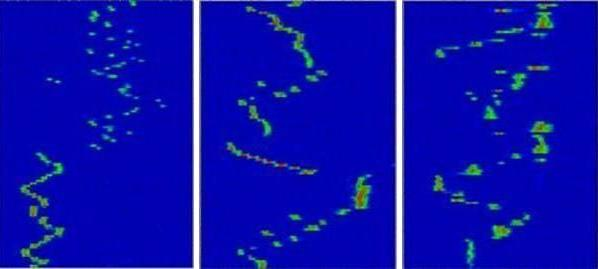

Sonograms (frequency variations) of 40-second pieces of three musical compositions from The First Theremin Concert: (from left to right) the last movement of the 9th Symphony by Beethoven, “The Swan” by Saint-Saens, and “Summertime” by Gershwin.

Single-side band (SSB) modulation was used for up-conversion of the Theremin's analog audio signals to carrier frequency 5010 MHz (6 cm wavelength) for sending toward the target stars.

== Targets ==
The target stars were:

| HD designation | Constellation | Distance (ly) | Spectral type | Signal power (kW) | Date sent | Arrival date |
|---|---|---|---|---|---|---|
| HD 197076 | Delphinus | 68.5 | G5V | 126 | August 29, 2001 | February 2070 |
| HD 95128 | Ursa Major | 45.9 | G0V | 96 | September 3, 2001 | July 2047 |
| HD 50692 | Gemini | 56.3 | G0V | 96 | September 3, 2001 | December 2057 |
| HD 126053 | Virgo | 57.4 | G1V | 96 | September 3, 2001 | January 2059 |
| HD 76151 | Hydra | 55.7 | G2V | 96 | September 4, 2001 | May 2057 |
| HD 193664 | Draco | 57.4 | G3V | 96 | September 4, 2001 | January 2059 |

== See also ==
- Across the Universe (message)
- Communication with extraterrestrial intelligence
- List of interstellar radio messages
- Search for extraterrestrial intelligence
- The Morse Message (1962)
