= Jamesburg Earth Station =

Former ground station in California

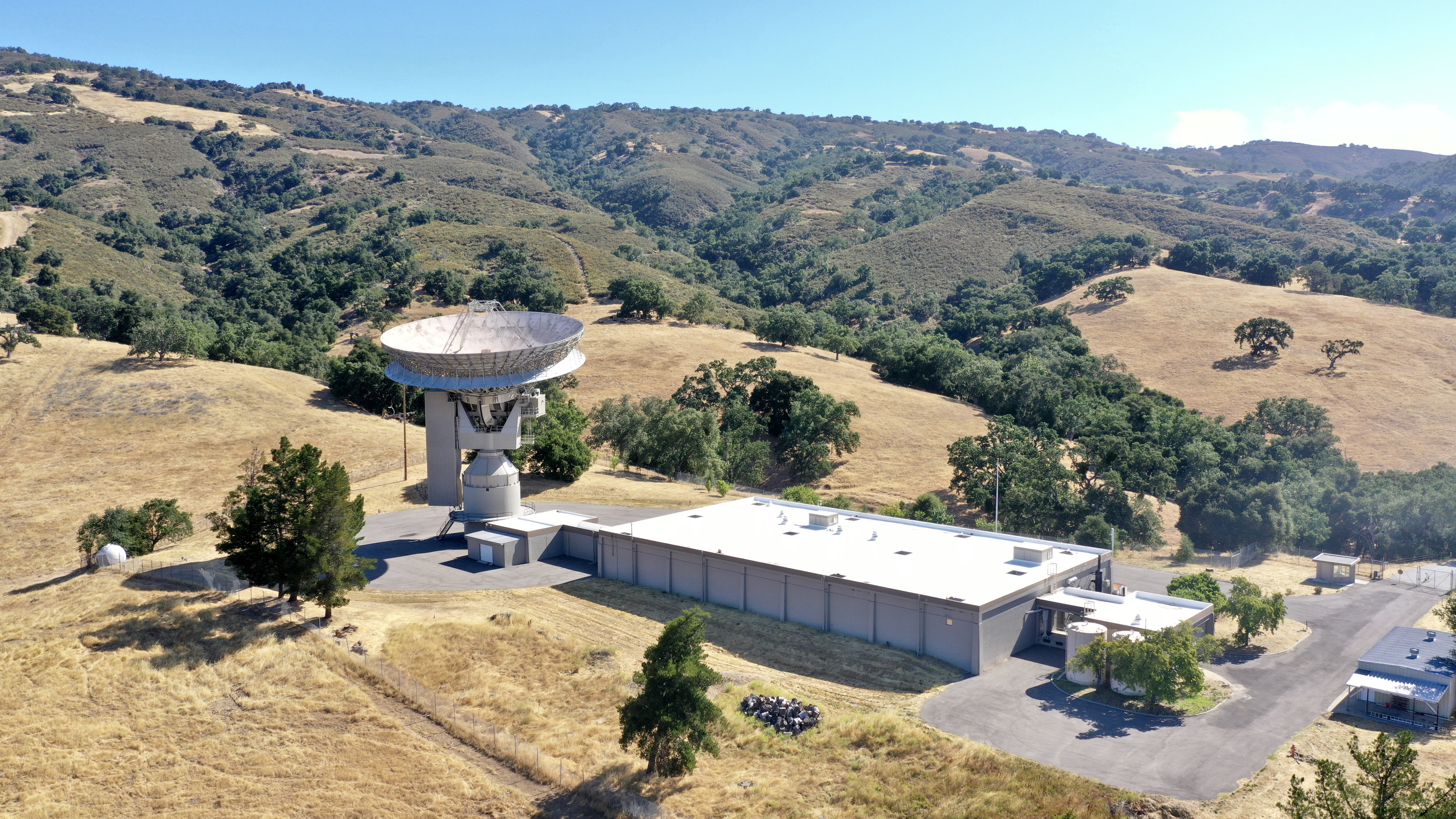
- Jamesburg Earth Station, July 2020
- Location: California, Pacific States Region
- Coordinates: 36°24′11″N 121°38′49″W
- Built: 1968
- Location within the United States
- Related media on Commons

The Jamesburg Earth Station is located in the rural Cachagua area of Carmel Valley, California, about 26 miles (42 km) southeast of Monterey. It was originally built in 1968 to support the Apollo 11 Moon landing.

The 10-story high, 30 metres (98 ft) dish, driven by a Vertex-RSI 7210 drive system, served for about 35 years as the West Coast Teleport of AT&T/COMSAT's communications Satellite Network, and was the Earth station serving Intelsat satellites parked in geosynchronous orbit over the Pacific Ocean. The dish played a role in capturing and distributing images of the Apollo 11 Moon landing and the Tiananmen Square protests of 1989. The dish is housed in a 20,000 square foot building on a 160 acres (65 ha) site that has been subdivided for residential building. When fiber-optic undersea communication cables became economically competitive in 2002, AT&T shut down the site and sold the entire station with its facilities intact. For a time, it was operated by 11 ham radio operators who spent five months restoring the facility. They were eventually able to bounce 20 radio signals off the moon.

In 2005, a new owner, intending to use the structure as a weekend home, stripped the interior and sold the contents as scrap, although the dish itself remains. The new owner decided to sell the property after his youngest son died of cancer. In January 2012, it was put up for sale for $2,950,000.

In 2013, the Jamesburg Earth Station was briefly leased by Lone Signal, an active SETI program, to send messages from the Earth to Gliese 526, a red dwarf star on the Catalog of Nearby Habitable Systems.

== Gallery ==
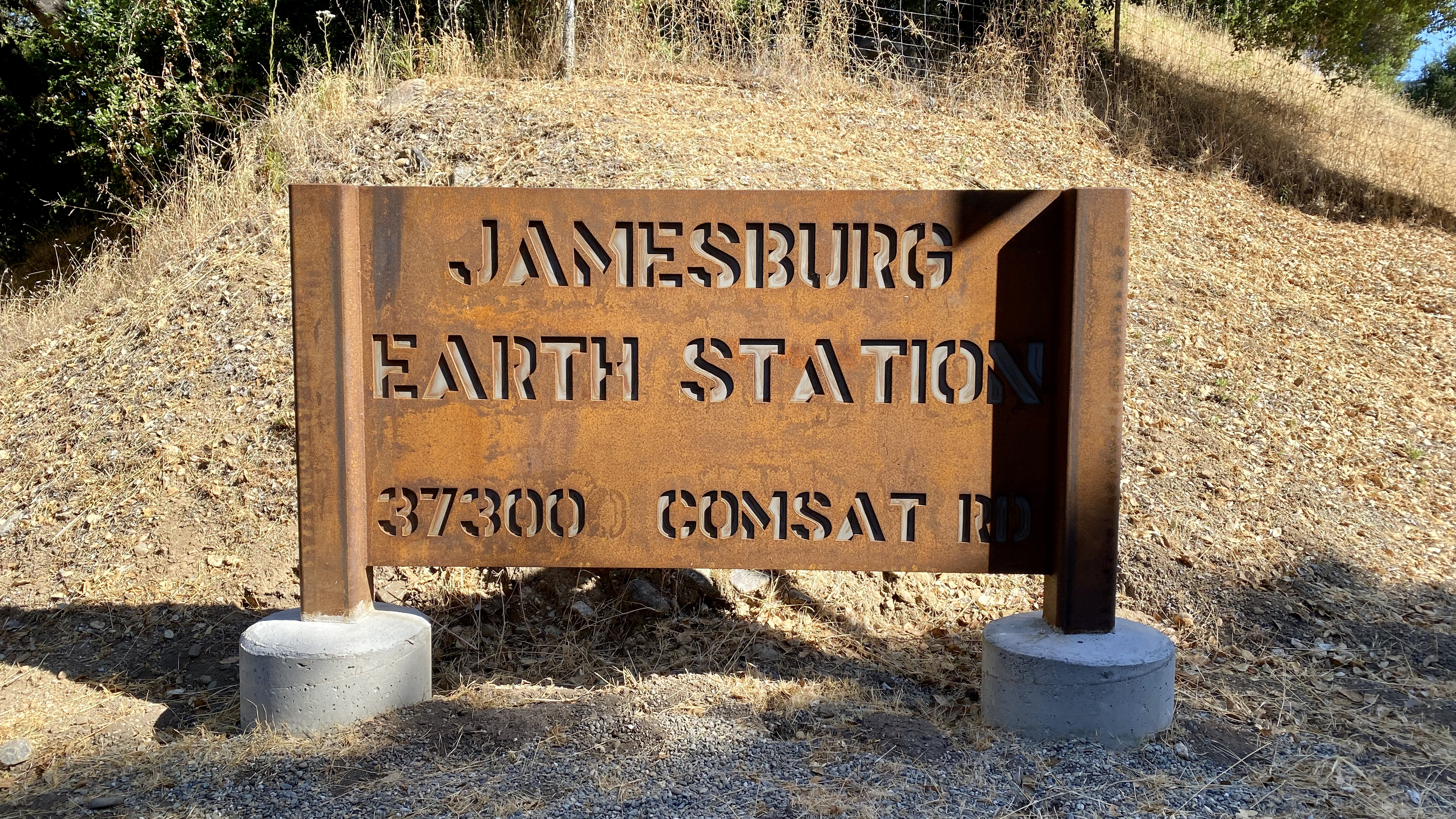
Sign at the entrance to the Jamesburg Earth Station - July 2020

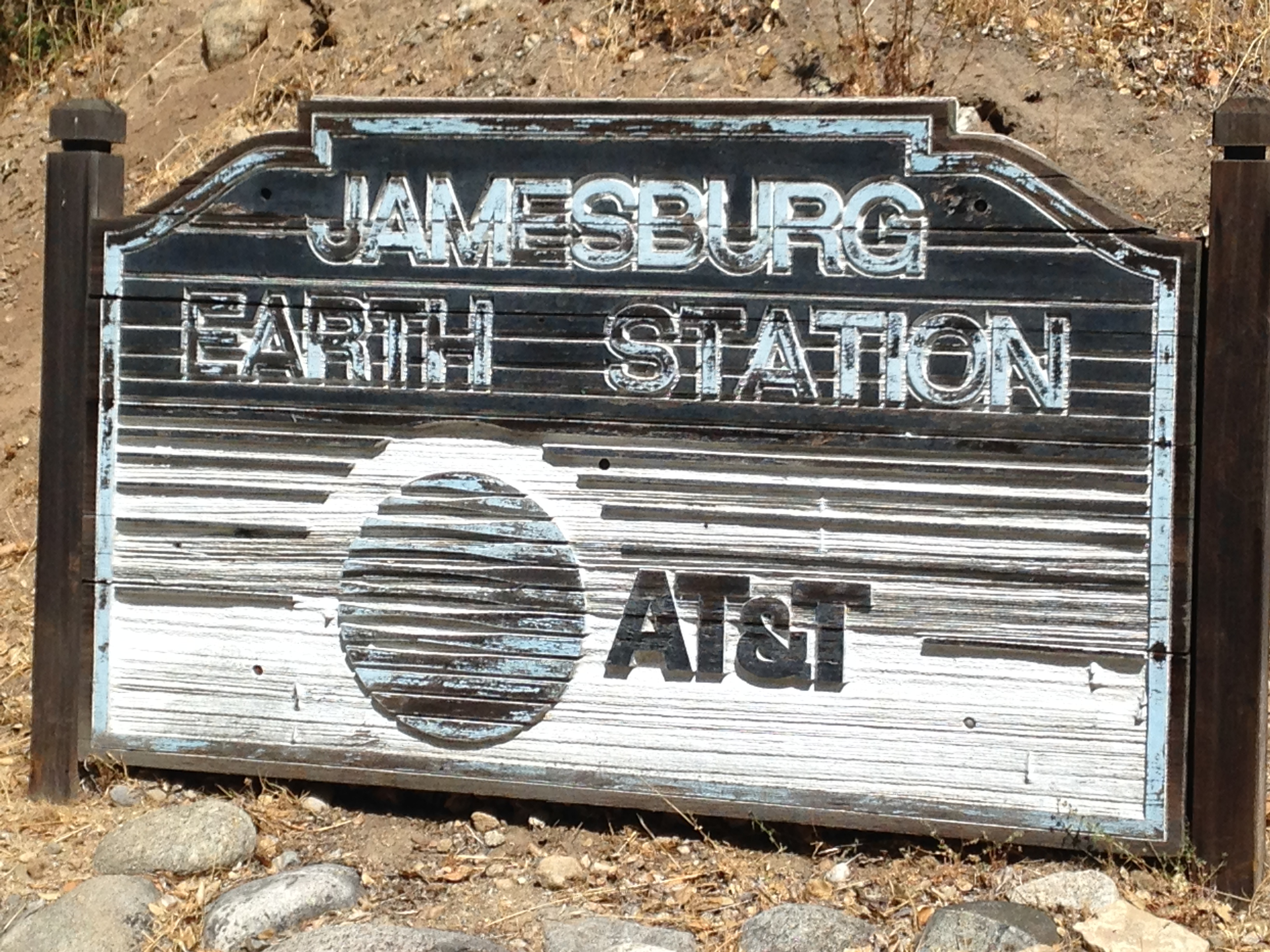
View of Jamesburg Earth Station ATT Sign - August 2014

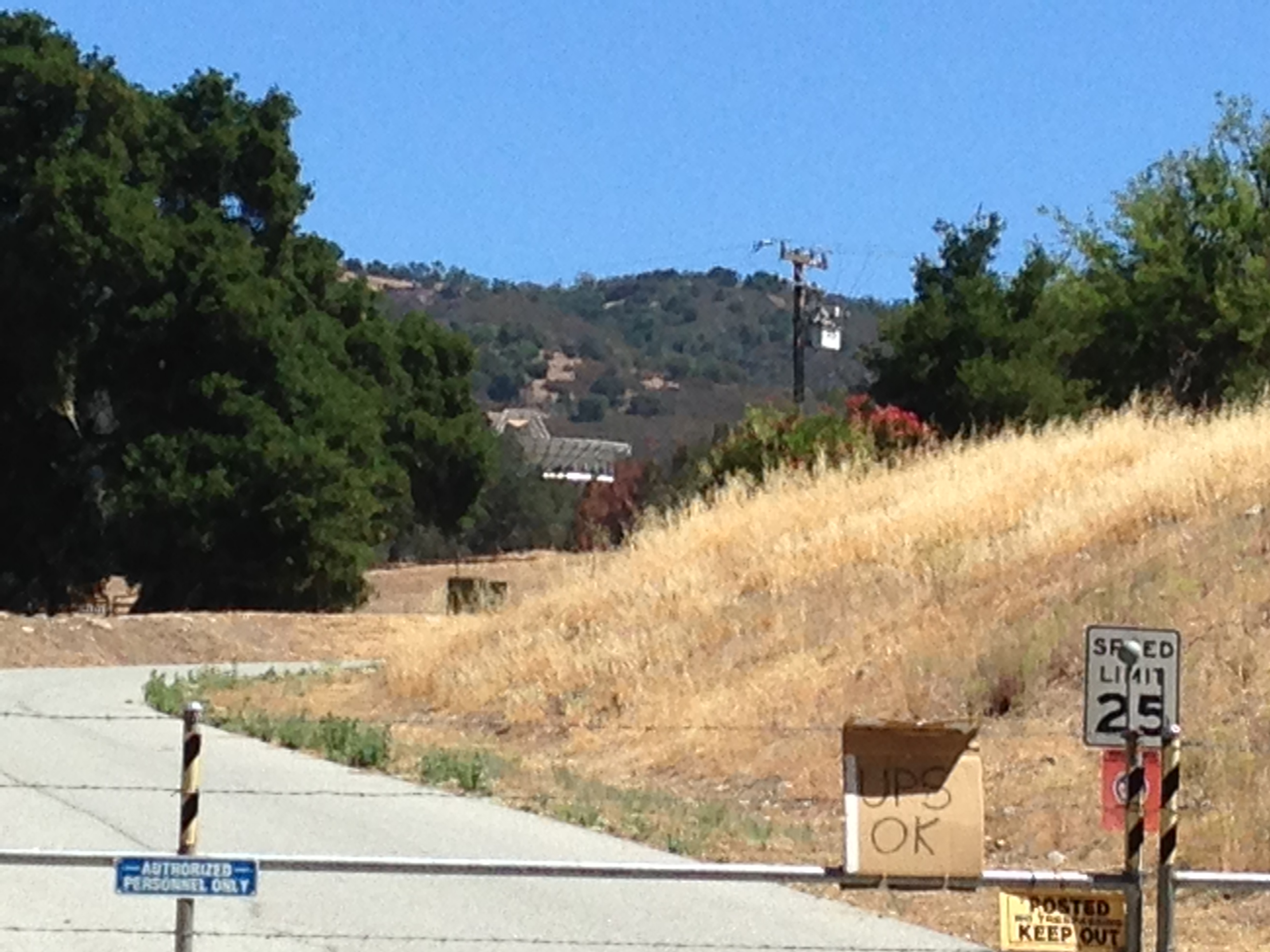
View of Jamesburg Earth Station from Driveway Gate - August 2014

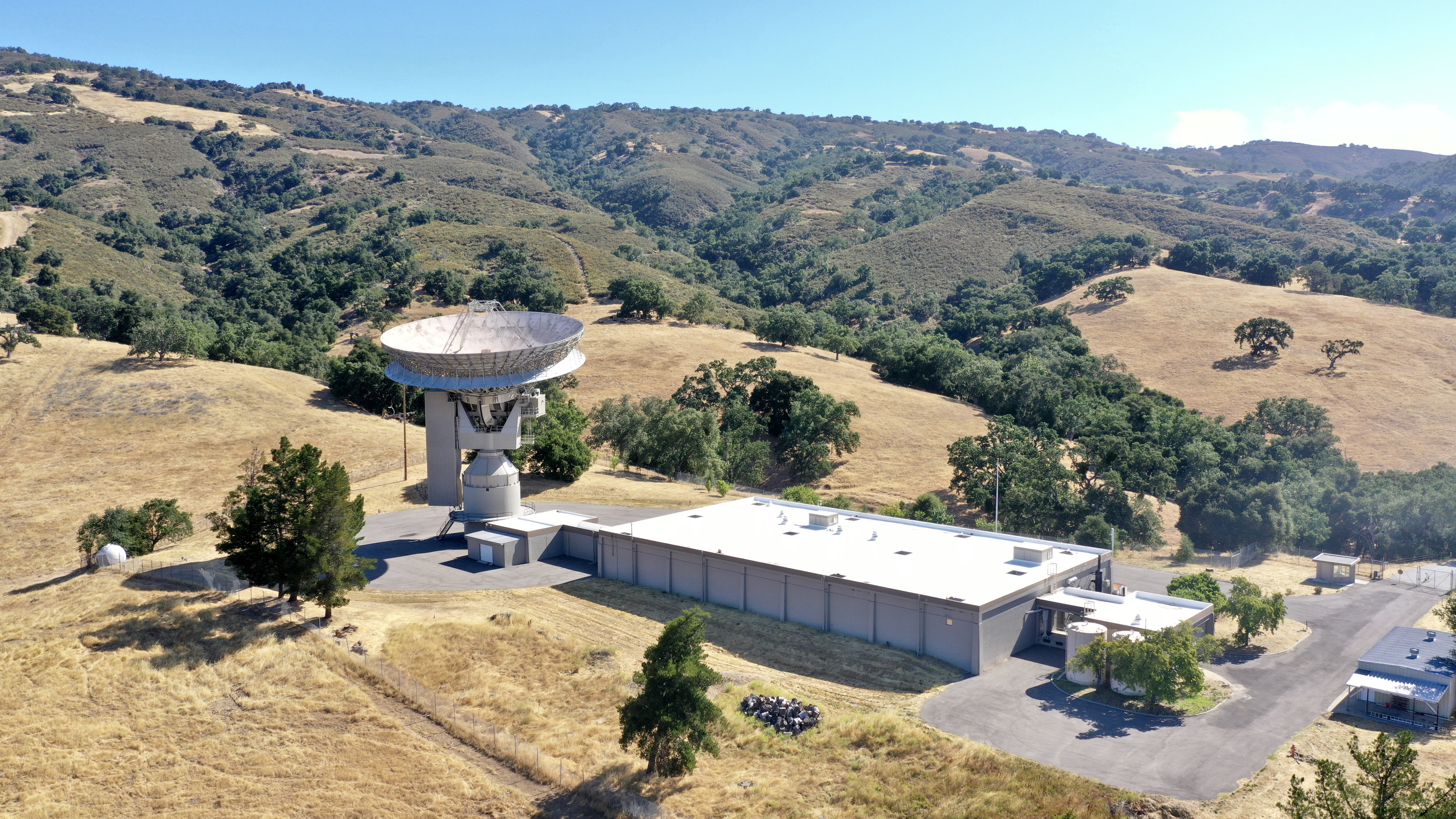
Aerial View - July 2020

== See also ==
- Andover Earth Station
- Carnarvon Tracking Station
- Roaring Creek Station
- Ground station
- Honeysuckle Creek Tracking Station
- Kaena Point Space Force Station
- Sugar Grove Station
- Goonhilly Satellite Earth Station
