= Active SETI =

Attempt to send messages to intelligent extraterrestrials

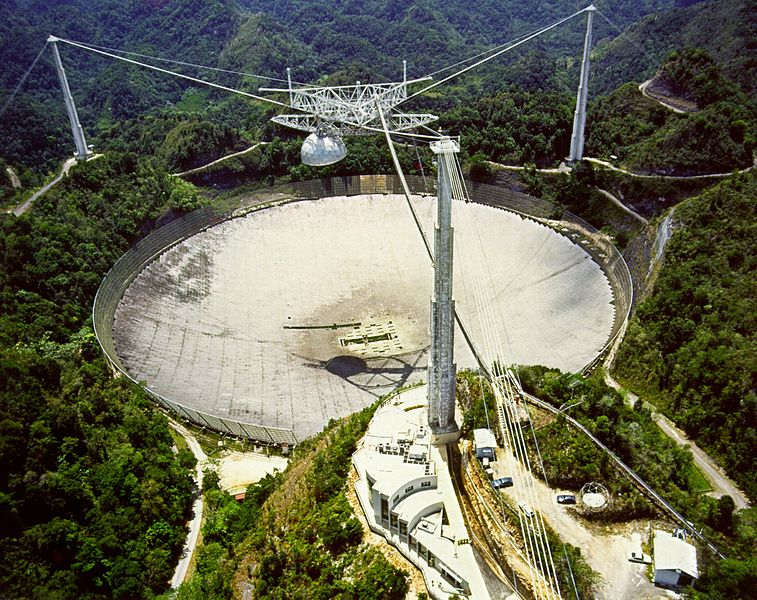
In 1974, the Arecibo Observatory was used to send the first known intentional radio message transmission into space

A representation of the 1679-bit Arecibo message

Active SETI (Active Search for Extra-Terrestrial Intelligence) are attempts to send messages to intelligent extraterrestrial life. Active SETI messages are predominantly sent in the form of radio signals. Physical messages like that of the Pioneer plaque may also be considered an active SETI message. Active SETI is also known as METI (Messaging to Extra-Terrestrial Intelligence). Whether humans should engage in Active SETI is controversial due to concerns about potential impacts of extraterrestrial contact, sparking a vigorous policy debate.

== History ==
'Active SETI' was a term as early as 2005, though some decades after the term SETI. The term METI was coined in 2006 by Russian scientist Alexander Zaitsev, who proposed a subtle distinction between Active SETI and METI:

The science known as SETI deals with searching for messages from aliens. METI deals with the creation and transmission of messages to aliens. Thus, SETI and METI proponents have quite different perspectives. SETI scientists are in a position to address only the local question "does Active SETI make sense?" In other words, would it be reasonable, for SETI success, to transmit with the object of attracting ETI's attention? In contrast to Active SETI, METI pursues not a local, but a more global purpose – to overcome the Great Silence in the Universe, bringing to our extraterrestrial neighbors the long-expected annunciation "You are not alone!"

Concern over METI was raised by the science journal Nature in an editorial in October 2006, which commented on a recent meeting of the International Academy of Astronautics SETI study group. The editor said, "It is not obvious that all extraterrestrial civilizations will be benign, or that contact with even a benign one would not have serious repercussions". In the same year, astronomer and science fiction author David Brin expressed similar concerns. In 2013 Brin amended his initial article based on the recent developments in METI.

In 2010, Douglas A. Vakoch from SETI Institute, addressed concerns about the validity of Active SETI alone as an experimental science by proposing the integration of Active SETI and Passive SETI programs to engage in a clearly articulated, ongoing, and evolving set of experiments to test various versions of the Zoo hypothesis, including specific dates at which a first response to messages sent to particular stars could be expected.

On 13 February 2015, scientists including Douglas Vakoch, David Grinspoon, Seth Shostak, and David Brin at an annual meeting of the American Association for the Advancement of Science discussed Active SETI, and whether transmitting a message to possible intelligent extraterrestrials in the Cosmos was a good idea. That same week, a statement was released, signed by many in the SETI community including Berkeley SETI Research Center director Andrew Siemion, advocating that a "worldwide scientific, political and humanitarian discussion must occur before any message is sent".

In July 2015, the Breakthrough Message program was announced. This was an open competition to design a digital message that could be transmitted from Earth to an extraterrestrial civilization, with a US$1,000,000 prize pool. The message was to be "representative of humanity and planet Earth". The program pledged "not to transmit any message until there has been a wide-ranging debate at high levels of science and politics on the risks and rewards of contacting advanced civilizations".

== Rationale for METI ==
In the paper Rationale for METI, transmission of the information into the Cosmos is treated as one of the pressing needs of an advanced civilization. This view is not universally accepted, and it is not agreed with by those who are against the transmission of interstellar radio messages, but at the same time are not against SETI searching. Such duality is called the SETI Paradox.

== Radio message construction ==
The lack of an established communications protocol is a challenge for METI. While trying to synthesize and project an Interstellar Radio Message (IRM), the receiving extraterrestrials (ETs) will first encounter a physical phenomenon and, only after that, perceive the information. Initially, a receiving system will detect the radio signal; then the issue of the extraction of the received information and comprehension of the obtained message will arise. Therefore, above all, the constructor of an IRM should be concerned about the ease of signal determination. In other words, the signal should have maximum openness, which is understood here as an antonym of the term security. This branch of signal synthesis is termed anticryptography.

To this end, in 2010, Michael W. Busch created a general-purpose binary language, later used in the Lone Signal project to transmit crowdsourced messages to extraterrestrial intelligence. Busch developed the coding scheme and provided Rachel M. Reddick with a test message, in a blind test of decryption. Reddick decoded the entire message after approximately twelve hours of work. This was followed by an attempt to extend the syntax used in the Lone Signal hailing message to communicate in a way that, while neither mathematical nor strictly logical, was nonetheless understandable given the prior definition of terms and concepts in the hailing message.

In addition, characteristics of the radio signal, such as wavelength, type of polarization, and modulation are considered. Over galactic distances, the interstellar medium induces some scintillation effects and artificial modulation of electromagnetic signals. This modulation is higher at lower frequencies and is a function of the sky direction. Over large distances, the depth of the modulation can exceed 100%, making any METI signal very difficult to decode.

=== Error correction ===
In METI research, any message must have some redundancy, although the exact amount of redundancy and message formats are still in great dispute. Using ideograms, instead of binary sequence, already offers some improvement against noise resistance. In faxlike transmissions, ideograms are spread on many lines. This increases its resistance against short bursts of noise like radio frequency interference or interstellar scintillation.

One format approach proposed for interstellar messages was to use the product of two prime numbers to construct an image. Unfortunately, this method works only if all the bits are present. As an example, the message sent by Frank Drake from the Arecibo Observatory in 1974 did not have any feature to support mechanisms to cope with the inevitable noise degradation of the interstellar medium.

Error correction tolerance rates for previous METI messages are 9% (one page) for the 1974 Arecibo Message, 44% (23 separate pages) for the 1999 Evpatoria Message, and 46% (one page, estimated) for the 2003 Evpatoria Message.

==== Examples ====
The 1999 Cosmic Call transmission was far from being optimal (from a terrestrial viewpoint) as it was essentially a monochromatic signal spiced with supplementary information. Additionally, the message had a very small modulation index overall, a condition not viewed as being optimal for interstellar communication. Over the 370,967 bits (46,371 bytes) sent, some 314,239 were "1" and 56,768 were "0"—5.54 times as many 1's as 0's. Since frequency-shift keying modulation scheme was used, most of the time the signal was on the "0" frequency. In addition, "0" tended to be sent in long stretches, which appeared as white lines in the message.

== Realized projects ==
The below projects have targeted stars between 17 and 69 light-years from the Earth. The exception is the Arecibo message, which targeted globular cluster M13, approximately 24,000 light-years away. The first interstellar message to reach its destination was the Altair (Morimoto–Hirabayashi) Message, which likely reached its target in 1999.

- The Morse Message (1962)
- Arecibo Message (1974)
- Cosmic Call 1 (1999)
- Teen Age Message (2001)
- Cosmic Call 2 (2003)
- Across the Universe (2008)
- Hello from Earth (2009)
- Wow! Reply (2012)
- Lone Signal (2013)
- A Simple Response to an Elemental Message (2016)

The choice of targets, transmission rate, and encoding may effect how likely a message will be received and interpreted by extraterrestrial intelligence. "Across the Universe" and "A Simple Response to an Elemental Message" were sent to Polaris, which is 431 light years distant from us and whose planetary system, even if it exists, may not be suited for life, because it is a supergiant star, spectral type F7Ib which is only 70 million years old. In addition, both transmission rates were very high, about 128 kbit/s, for such moderate transmitter power (about 18 kW). The main defect of the "Hello From Earth" is an insufficient scientific and technical justification, since no famous SETI scientist made statements with validation of HFE's design. As it follows from : "After the final message was collected on Monday 24 August 2009, messages were exported as a text file and sent to NASA's Jet Propulsion Laboratory in California, where they were encoded into binary, packaged and tested before transmission", but nobody explained why he hopes that such encoded and packaged text will be understood and conceived by possible extraterrestrials.

== Transmissions ==
Below is a table of messages sent and target/destination stars, ordered chronologically by date of sending:

Name	Designation	Constellation	Date sent (YYYY-MM-DD)	Arrival date (YYYY-MM-DD)	Message
Messier 13	NGC 6205	Hercules	1974-11-16	27000~	Arecibo Message
Altair	Alpha Aql	Aquila	1983-08-15	2017	CALL to the COSMOS'83
Libra		Libra	1995		NASDA Cosmic-College
			1996		NASDA Cosmic-College
Spica	Alpha Vir	Virgo	1997-08	2247	NASDA Cosmic-College
			1998		NASDA Cosmic-College
16 Cyg A	HD 186408	Cygnus	1999-05-24	2069-11	Cosmic Call 1
15 Sge	HD 190406	Sagitta	1999-06-30	2057-02	Cosmic Call 1
	HD 178428	Sagitta	1999-06-30	2067-10	Cosmic Call 1
Gl 777	HD 190360	Cygnus	1999-07-01	2051-04	Cosmic Call 1
	HD 197076	Delphinus	2001-08-29	2070-02	Teen Age Message
47 UMa	HD 95128	Ursa Major	2001-09-03	2047-07	Teen Age Message
37 Gem	HD 50692	Gemini	2001-09-03	2057-12	Teen Age Message
	HD 126053	Virgo	2001-09	2059-01	Teen Age Message
	HD 76151	Hydra	2001-09-04	2057-05	Teen Age Message
	HD 193664	Draco	2001-09-04	2059-01	Teen Age Message
	HIP 4872	Cassiopeia	2003-07-06	2036-04	Cosmic Call 2
	HD 245409	Orion	2003-07-06	2040-08	Cosmic Call 2
55 Cnc	HD 75732	Cancer	2003-07-06	2044-05	Cosmic Call 2
	HD 10307	Andromeda	2003-07-06	2044-09	Cosmic Call 2
47 UMa	HD 95128	Ursa Major	2003-07-06	2049-05	Cosmic Call 2
Polaris	HIP 11767	Ursa Minor	2008-02-04	2439	Across the Universe
Gliese 581	HIP 74995	Libra	2008-10-09	2029	A Message From Earth
Gliese 581	HIP 74995	Libra	2009-08-28	2030	Hello From Earth
GJ 83.1	GJ 83.1	Aries	2009-11-07	2024	RuBisCo Stars
Teegarden's Star	SO J025300.5+165258	Aries	2009-11-07	2022	RuBisCo Stars
Kappa^{1} Ceti	GJ 137	Cetus	2009-11-07	2039	RuBisCo Stars
	HIP 34511	Gemini	2012-08-15	2163	Wow! Reply
37 Gem	HD 50692	Gemini	2012-08-15	2069	Wow! Reply
55 Cnc	HD 75732	Cancer	2012-08-15	2053	Wow! Reply
GJ 526	HD 119850	Boötes	2013-07-10	2031	Lone Signal
55 Cnc	HD 75732	Cancer	2013-09-22	2053	JAXA Space Camp (UDSC-1)
55 Cnc	HD 75732	Cancer	2014-08-23	2054	JAXA Space Camp (UDSC-2)
Polaris	HIP 11767	Ursa Minor	2016-10-10	2450	A Simple Response to an Elemental Message
Luyten's Star	HIP 36208	Canis Major	2017-10-16	2030-03	Sónar Calling GJ273b

== Controversy ==
Whether or not to conduct Active SETI, as well as the tone of any message, is a highly controversial topic. Active SETI has primarily been criticized due to the perceived risk of revealing the location of the Earth to alien civilizations, without some process of prior international consultation. That is, Active SETI does not meet the criteria for informed consent in a mass experiment involving human subjects and, potentially, nonhuman sentient subjects.

Active SETI is discussed in terms of the ethics of space policy. Issues include whether to send belligerent versus defensive messages, cosmopolitanism, communicative burden, consensus, messaging content, proscriptions on premature messaging, responsibility, and shared values, with concerns that even if successful, humanity could be reduced to a cargo cult. David Brin also urged for an extensive international consultation before any METI activities and has debunked key rationalizations for active SETI (METI), such as the "barn door" argument (unintentional "leaked signals" were millions-fold weaker than intentional METI signals), ignoring/dismissing the precautionary principle (that requires taking extreme precaution e.g. handling extraterrestrial samples even without any known example of risks), and treating METI as being prayer-like which disregards the issue of informed consent from other people. Notable among METI's critics was Stephen Hawking, who, in his book A Brief History of Time suggested that "alerting" extraterrestrial intelligences to our existence is foolhardy, citing humankind's history of treating its own kind harshly in meetings of civilizations with a significant technology gap, e.g., the extermination of Tasmanian aborigines. He suggested, in view of this history, that we "lay low". Scientist and science fiction author David Brin expressed similar concerns. Similarly, Liu Cixin's trilogy of novels The Remembrance of Earth's Past Trilogy highlights the potential dangers of METI.

However, some scientists consider these fears about the dangers of METI as panic and irrational superstition; Russian and Soviet radio engineer and astronomer Alexander L. Zaitsev has argued against these concerns. Zaitsev argues that we should consider the risks of not attempting to contact extraterrestrial civilizations, since the knowledge and wisdom an ETI could impart to us would save us from humanity's self-destructive tendencies. Similarly, in a March 2015 essay astronomer Seth Shostak considered the risk and ended by stressing that any danger was hypothetical and that humanity would better off risk contact than "endlessly tremble at the sight of the stars".

Astronomer Jill Tarter also disagrees with Hawking, arguing that aliens developed and long-lived enough to communicate and travel across interstellar distances would have evolved a cooperative and less violent intelligence. She however thinks it is too soon for humans to attempt active SETI and that humans should be more advanced technologically first but keep listening in the meantime.

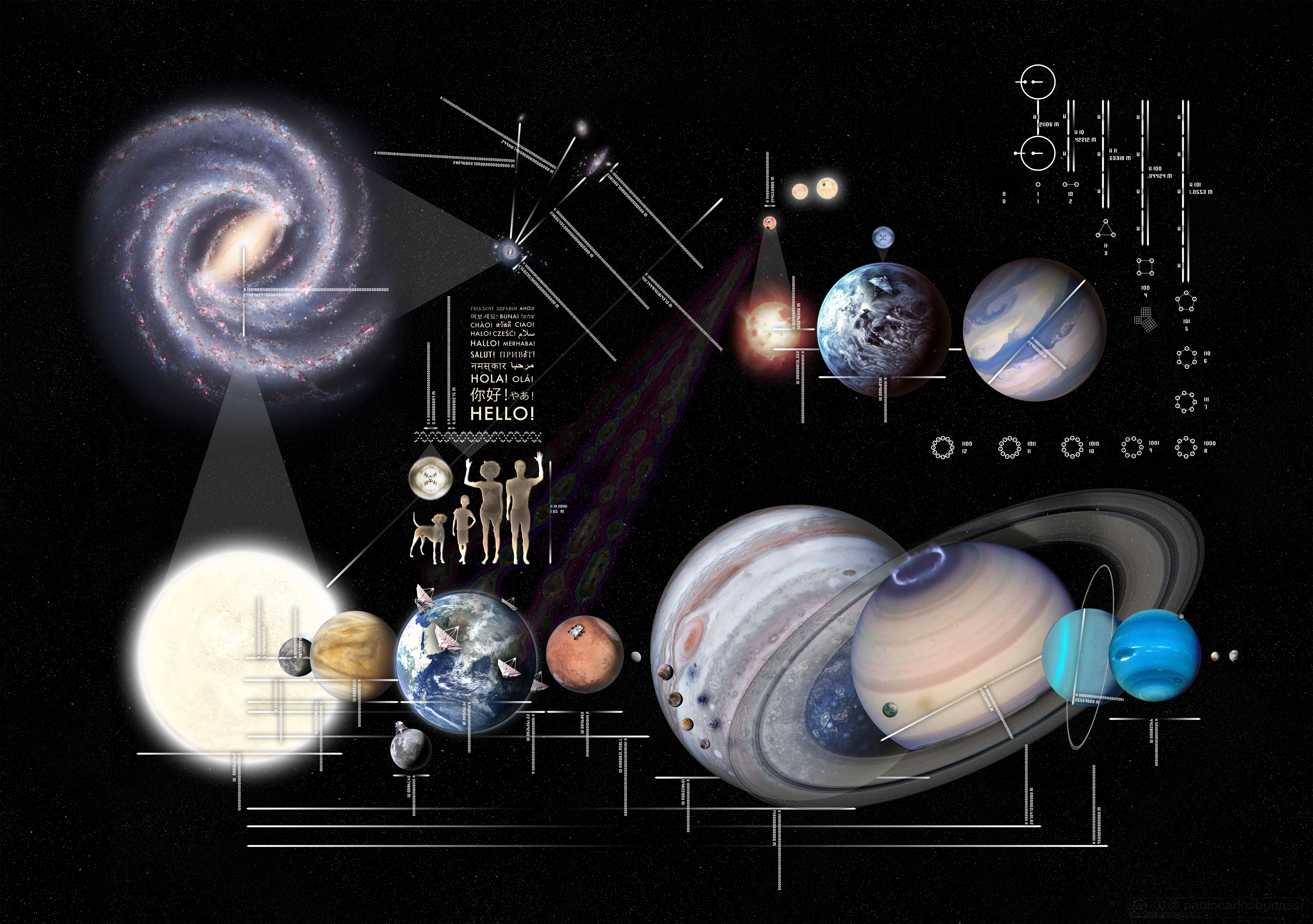
Example of a high-resolution pictorial message to potential ETI at Proxima Centauri. These messages usually contain information about the location of the solar system in the Milky Way.

To lend a quantitative basis to discussions of the risks of transmitting deliberate messages from Earth, the SETI Permanent Study Group of the International Academy of Astronautics adopted in 2007 a new analytical tool, the San Marino Scale. Developed by Prof. Ivan Almar and Prof. H. Paul Shuch, the San Marino Scale evaluates the significance of transmissions from Earth as a function of signal intensity and information content. Its adoption suggests that not all such transmissions are created equal, thus each must be evaluated separately before establishing a blanket international policy regarding Active SETI.

In 2012, Jacob Haqq-Misra, Michael Busch, Sanjoy Som, and Seth Baum argued that while the benefits of radio communication on Earth likely outweigh the potential harms of detection by extraterrestrial watchers, the uncertainty regarding the outcome of contact with extraterrestrial beings creates difficulty in assessing whether or not to engage in long-term and large-scale METI.

In 2015, in the context of the Zoo Hypothesis, biologist João Pedro de Magalhães proposed transmitting an invitation message to any extraterrestrial intelligences watching us already and inviting them to respond, arguing this would not put us in any more danger than we are already if the Zoo Hypothesis is correct.

Douglas Vakoch, president of METI, argues that passive SETI itself is already an endorsement of active SETI, since "If we detect a signal from aliens through a SETI program, there's no way to prevent a cacophony of responses from Earth."

In the context of potentially detected extraterrestrial activity on Earth, physicist Mark Buchanan argued that humanity needs to determine whether it would be safe or wise to attempt to communicate with extraterrestrials and work on ways to handle such attempts in an organized manner.

== Beacon proposals ==
One proposal for a 10 billion watt interstellar SETI beacon was dismissed by Robert A. Freitas Jr. as being infeasible for a pre-Type I civilization, such as humanity, on the Kardashev scale. However, this 1980s technical argument assumes omni-directional beacons, which may not be the best way to proceed on many technical grounds. Advances in consumer electronics have made possible transmitters that simultaneously transmit many narrow beams, covering the million or so nearest stars but not the spaces between. This multibeam approach can reduce the power and cost to levels that are reasonable with early 21st century Earth technology.

Once civilizations have discovered each other's locations, the energy requirements for maintaining contact and exchanging information can be significantly reduced through the use of highly directional transmission technologies. To this end, a 2018 study estimated a 1–2 megawatt infrared laser focused through a 30-45 meter telescope could be seen from about 20,000 light years away.

== See also ==
- Communication with extraterrestrial intelligence
- Dark forest hypothesis, the idea that planetary civilizations remain silent to avoid the possibility of contact with potentially aggressive worlds
- Detecting Earth from distant star-based systems
- METI (Messaging Extraterrestrial Intelligence) – Organization conducting active SETI
- SETIcon – Public conventions on the search for extraterrestrial intelligence
- SETI@home
- Wow! signal
