= Lone Signal =

Crowdfunded project to send interstellar communications to extraterrestrials

- Industry: Search for extraterrestrial intelligence
- Founded: New York, United States (June 18, 2013)
- Founder: Pierre Fabre, President
- Headquarters: Jamesburg Earth Station, United States
- Key people: Jamie King, CEO; Narayana Ackley, CTO; Eric Eim, COO; Jacob Haqq-Misra, CSO; Ernesto Qualizza, CMO
- Services: Messages to extraterrestrial intelligence
- Number of employees: 3
- Website: www.lonesignal.com (Currently unavailable)

Lone Signal was a crowdfunded active SETI project designed to send interstellar messages from Earth to a possible extraterrestrial civilization. Founded by businessman Pierre Fabre and supported by several entrepreneurs, Lone Signal was based at the Jamesburg Earth Station in Carmel, California.

The project's beacon, which commenced continuous operations on June 17, 2013, transmitted short, 144-character messages by citizens of Earth to the red dwarf star Gliese 526, located 17.6 light-years away from Earth in the constellation Boötes. Gliese 526 has no known planets. The Lone Signal team hoped to earn US$100 million to construct a network of satellite dishes across the Earth's surface, which could beam messages to many regions of the Milky Way galaxy. The project ceased transmission shortly after it began, due to lack of funding, having operated roughly from June to August 2013. (Note: The first snapshot showing messages to be sent is in June 2013 and the last snapshot showing sent messages is in August 2013. Later snapshots show only queued messages yet to be sent.)

== Message components ==
Lone Signal's message design had two components: a binary unmodulated hailing component and an 8-bit frequency-modulated message component, with each bit in the latter represented by a separate frequency.

The hailing message was a sequence of prime numbers as used in Carl Sagan's Contact, and then a message based on the design of planetary scientist Michael W. Busch. The message is meant to be easily deciphered, and uses operators and symbols from mathematics and logic to give coherent statements about the laws of physics and Earth's location in the galaxy. It was also meant to provide a sufficient key to decipher the linguistic message component. The hailing message was to repeat on average three times in order to allow the recipient to decode it at any time when observation begins, with some parts repeating more often than others.

The message component was to consist of brief, 144-character statements provided by the general public. These statements, with widely varying languages and contents, were posted from the Lone Signal website. Individuals who have signed up to send messages with Lone Signal, collectively known as the "beaming community", were permitted to send one message for free, and thereafter required to purchase "message credits" of $0.25 per message sent in order to fund the operation of the project. The content of messages sent via Lone Signal could be syndicated to the Twitter and Facebook accounts of beaming community members as desired. It was in this beaming community user space that an attempt was being made to extend the syntax used in the hailing message to communicate in a way that, while neither mathematical nor strictly logical, was nonetheless designed to be understandable given the prior definition of terms and concepts in the hailing message.

== Potential dangers and detectability ==
Various commentators have identified several dangers with messaging extraterrestrial intelligence, which chief scientific officer Jacob Haqq-Misra covered in a 2013 paper before joining Lone Signal. In his paper, Haqq-Misra stated that while ordinary communication which might involve inadvertent leakage into space would not pose a threat, the dangers of actively beaming messages to extraterrestrial intelligences, and hence a determination of whether or not such beaming activities should be carried out, are uncertain.

Upon becoming an executive of Lone Signal, Haqq-Misra stated his belief that extraterrestrial civilizations probably already know of humanity's existence, and reaffirmed his position that the cultural impact of extraterrestrial contact is unknowable. He based this belief on the fact that various other radio sources have been broadcasting into space for decades, and would be detectable to any civilization with sufficiently large radio telescopes. At the same time, though, the previous messages from the most powerful beaming sources were intermittent, while Lone Signal aimed to establish the first continuous beam to space.
