= Yevpatoria RT-70 radio telescope =

Radio telescope in Crimea

Evpatoria Observatory
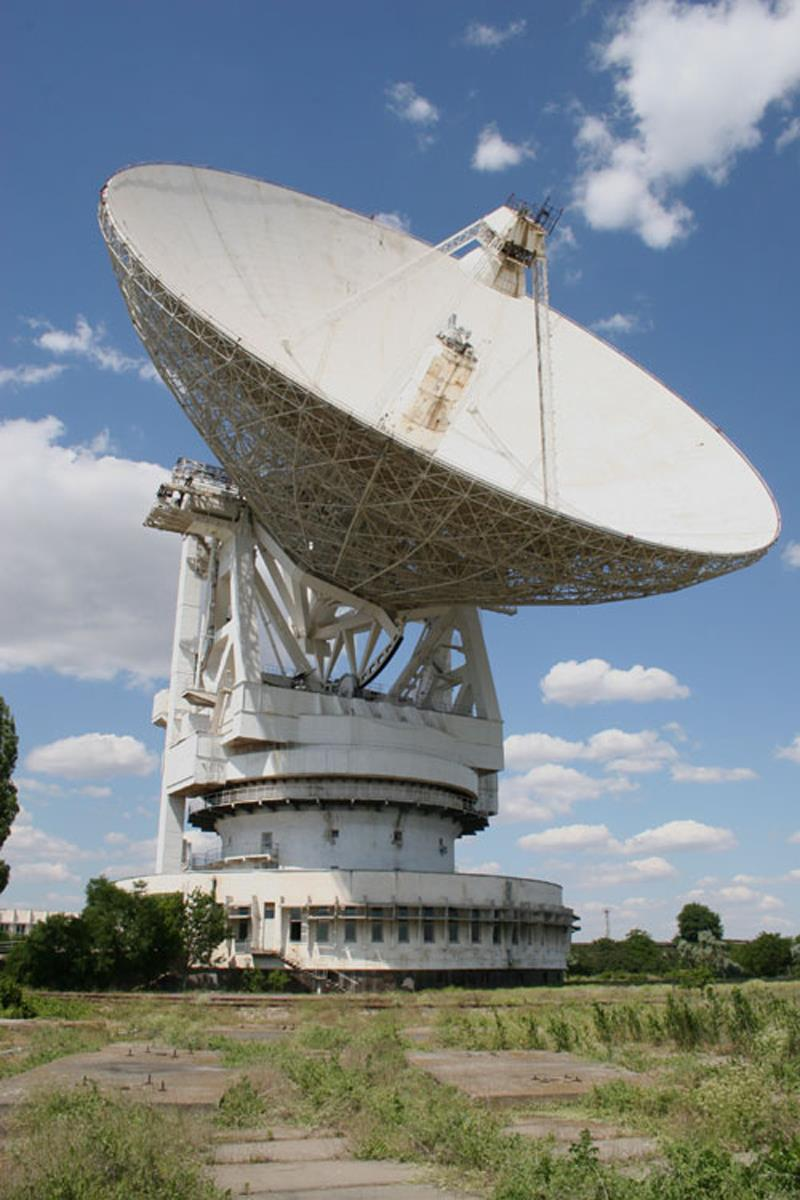
- Alternative names: Yevpatoria RT-70 radio telescope
- Location: Yevpatoria, Crimea, Ukraine
- Coordinates: 45°11′N 33°11′E
- Wavelength: 0.1 cm (300 GHz)–6 cm (5.0 GHz)
- Diameter: 70 m (229 ft 8 in)
- Collecting area: 2,500 m^{2} (27,000 sq ft)
- Website: lfvn.astronomer.ru/optic/evpatoria/rt70/index.htm
- Location within Crimea Location within Ukraine Location within Russia
- Related media on Commons

The Yevpatoria RT-70 radio telescope (P-2500, RT-70) is an RT-70 radio telescope and planetary radar at the Center for Deep Space Communications, Yevpatoria, Crimea. In scientific literature, it is often called the Evpatoria Planetary Radar (EPR).

== History ==
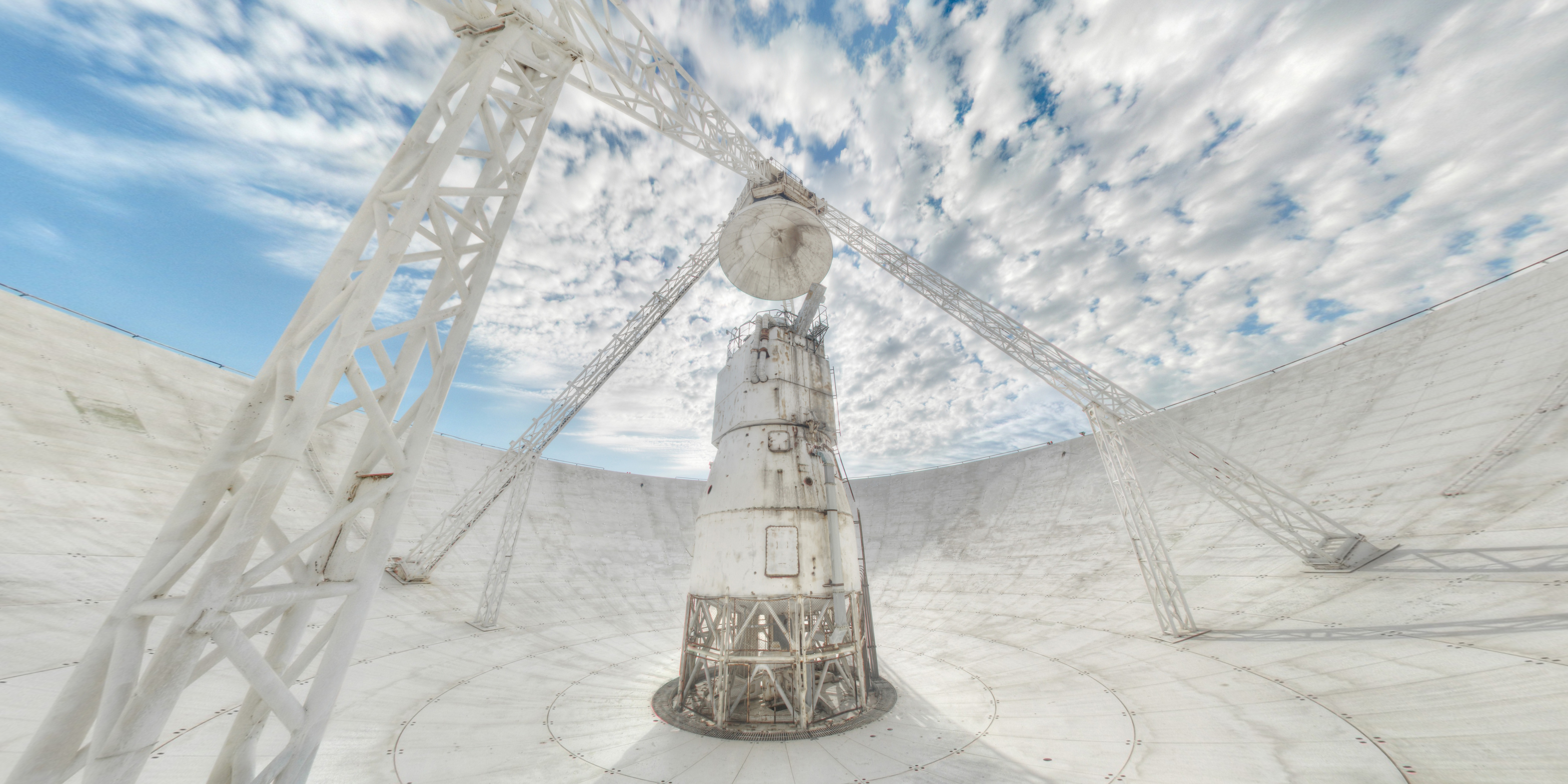
Inside antenna mirror of radio telescope RT-70

Radio telescopes are highly sensitive detectors of signals from outer space. With its 70-meter antenna diameter, the Yevpatoria RT-70 is among the largest single-dish radio telescopes in the world. It has an advantage in comparison with other large radio telescopes in the fact that the complex includes powerful transmitters that allow active space experiments. Powerful electromagnetic beams can be accurately targeted and the signals received can be analyzed. For this reason, the Yevpatoria RT-70 radio telescope is one of only two in the world that are able to transmit messages to extraterrestrial civilizations, e.g. the multiple Cosmic Calls, Teen Age Messages, or A Message from Earth (AMFE).

The radio telescope is depicted on Russia's commemorative 100-ruble banknote of 2015.

In August 2025, the main dish of the telescope was hit by a Ukrainian drone as part of the Russo-Ukrainian War.

== Missions ==
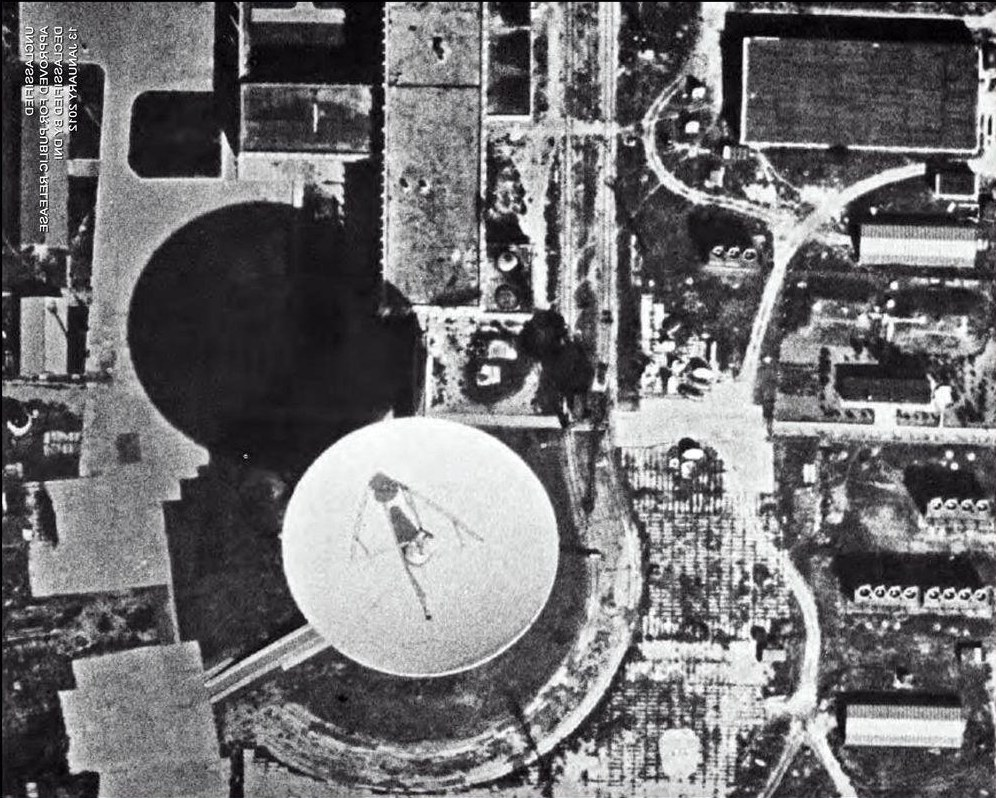
P-2500. Photo by KH-9 HEXAGON (1982)

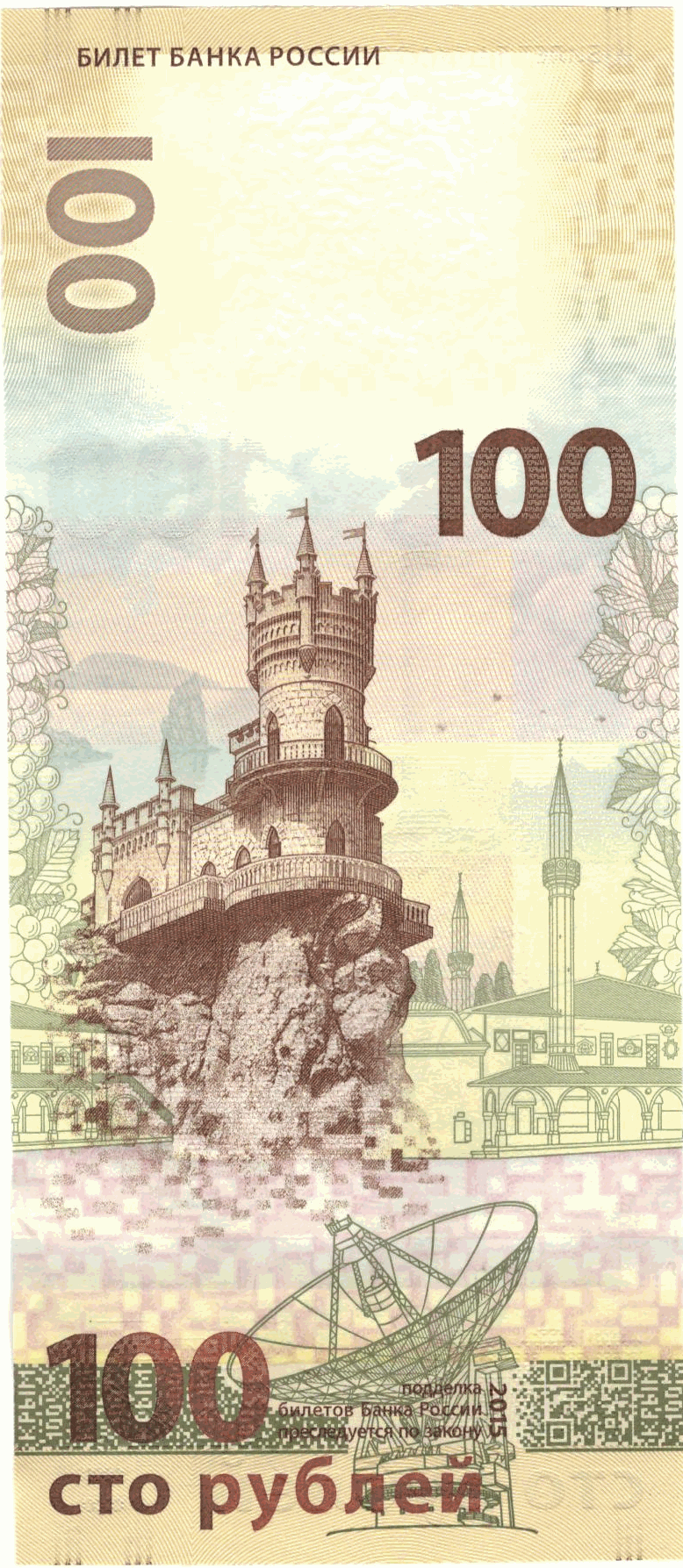
100 Russian ruble banknote issued in 2015

The telescope participated in the Soviet space program since 1978 for the exploration of deep space:

- Venera 11 and Venera 12
- VLBI Salyut 6 KRT-10 radio observatory — RT-70
- Venera 13, Venera 14, Venera 15, Venera 16
- Vega program
- Astron
- Phobos program
- Granat
- Interball
- Fobos-Grunt (in 2011)
- Spektr-R

In 1999, 2001, 2003, and 2008, for the transmission of messages to extraterrestrial civilizations:

- Cosmic Call
- Teen Age Message
- Cosmic Call 2
- A Message From Earth

Radar studies of planets and asteroids – Observatory code 255 (Evpatoria):

- 4179 Toutatis
- 6489 Golevka (the name Golevka comes from the first few letters of the names of the three observatories Goldstone, Evpatoria, and Kashima)
- (33342) 1998 WT24
- 101955 Bennu

== See also ==
- Complex “Pluton-M” – at Center for Deep Space Communications
- Galenki RT-70 radio telescope – at the Ussuriysk Astrophysical Observatory
- Goldstone Deep Space Communications Complex
- Suffa RT-70 radio telescope – at the Suffa Radio Observatory
