= João Pedro de Magalhães =

Portuguese microbiologist

- Born: Porto, Portugal
- Education: Católica
- Scientific career
- Workplaces: University of Birmingham

Joao Pedro De Magalhaes is a Portuguese molecular biologist. He studies aging through both computational and experimental approaches.

In 1999, he obtained his degree in Microbiology from Escola Superior de Biotecnologia. Under Olivier Toussaint, he obtained his PhD from the University of Namur in 2004. Then he did a postdoc in the George Church lab at Harvard Medical School from 2004 to 2008.

In 2008, he was recruited by the University of Liverpool to lead a lab studying genomic approaches to aging. In 2022, he was recruited by the University of Birmingham to be Chair of Molecular Biogerontology, and he currently leads the Genomics of Aging and Rejuvenation Lab there.

He helps maintain several databases on aging - among them - GenAge, AnAge, DrugAge, CellAge, GenDR, the Digital Aging Atlas, and Who's Who in Gerontology. His research group helped sequence the transcriptome of the long-lived bowhead whale. He also helps advise the Lifeboat Foundation.

Among his many longevity-related scientific research projects, Magalhães has sequenced and analyzed the genome of the bowhead whale as well as contributed to analysis of the genome of the naked mole rat. Both of these mammals are notably long-lived and cancer-resistant.
