= 37 Geminorum =

Star in the constellation Gemini

- Location of 37 Geminorum (circled in red)

Observation data Epoch J2000 Equinox ICRS
- Constellation: Gemini
- Right ascension: 06^{h} 55^{m} 18.66636^{s}
- Declination: +25° 22′ 32.5036″
- Apparent magnitude (V): 5.74

Characteristics
- Evolutionary stage: main sequence
- Spectral type: G0 V
- U−B color index: +0.01
- B−V color index: 0.573±0.010

Astrometry
| Radial velocity (R_{v}) | −14.94±0.15 km/s |
| Proper motion (μ) | RA: −37.595 mas/yr Dec.: +24.234 mas/yr |
| Parallax (π) | 57.4559±0.0907 mas |
| Distance | 56.77 ± 0.09 ly (17.40 ± 0.03 pc) |
| Absolute magnitude (M_{V}) | 4.56 |

Details
| Mass | 1.08 M_{☉} |
| Radius | 1.08 R_{☉} |
| Luminosity | 1.29 L_{☉} |
| Surface gravity (log g) | 4.40 cgs |
| Temperature | 5,913 K |
| Metallicity [Fe/H] | −0.25 dex |
| Rotation | 25.0 d |
| Rotational velocity (v sin i) | 1.89 km/s |
| Age | 5.49 Gyr |

Other designations
- BD+25°1496, GJ 252, HD 50692, HIP 33277, HR 2569, SAO 78866

Database references
| SIMBAD | data |

37 Geminorum is a solitary Sun-like star located at the northwest part of the northern constellation of Gemini, about three degrees to the east of the bright star Epsilon Geminorum. The apparent visual magnitude of 37 Geminorum is 5.74, which is just bright enough to be visible to the naked eye on a dark night. It is located at a distance of 57 light years from the Sun based on parallax. This star is drifting closer with a radial velocity of −15 km/s, and is predicted to come as near as 13.8 light-years in approximately a million years. It is positioned close enough to the ecliptic to be subject to lunar occultations, such as happened on April 8, 1984.

== Properties ==
The stellar classification of 37 Geminorum is G0 V, which indicates it is an ordinary G-type main sequence star that is generating energy through core hydrogen fusion. In 2007, J. C. Hall and associates categorized it as a solar-type with a high mean activity level. The star is around 5.5 billion years old and is spinning with a rotation period of 25 days. It is slightly larger and more massive than the Sun, with a lower abundance of heavier elements based on its abundance of iron. 37 Geminorum is radiating 1.1 times the luminosity of the Sun from its photosphere at an effective temperature of 5,913 K.

As of 2012, no extrasolar planets or debris disks have yet been discovered around it. The center of the star's habitable zone lies at a distance of 1.32 AU.

== Teen Age Message ==
There was a METI message sent to 37 Geminorum. It was transmitted from Eurasia's largest radar, 70-meter Yevpatoria Planetary Radar. The message was named the Teen Age Message, it was sent on September 3, 2001, and it will arrive at 37 Geminorum in December 2057.

== Catalog of Nearby Habitable Systems ==
The Catalog of Nearby Habitable Systems (HabCat) is a list of approximately 17,000 relatively close stars similar to the sun and considered able to support a planet habitable by humans. 37 Geminorum is on the HabCat list.

== See also ==
- 18 Scorpii
