= Cosmic Call =

Interstellar radio messages sent to nearby stars in 1999 and 2003

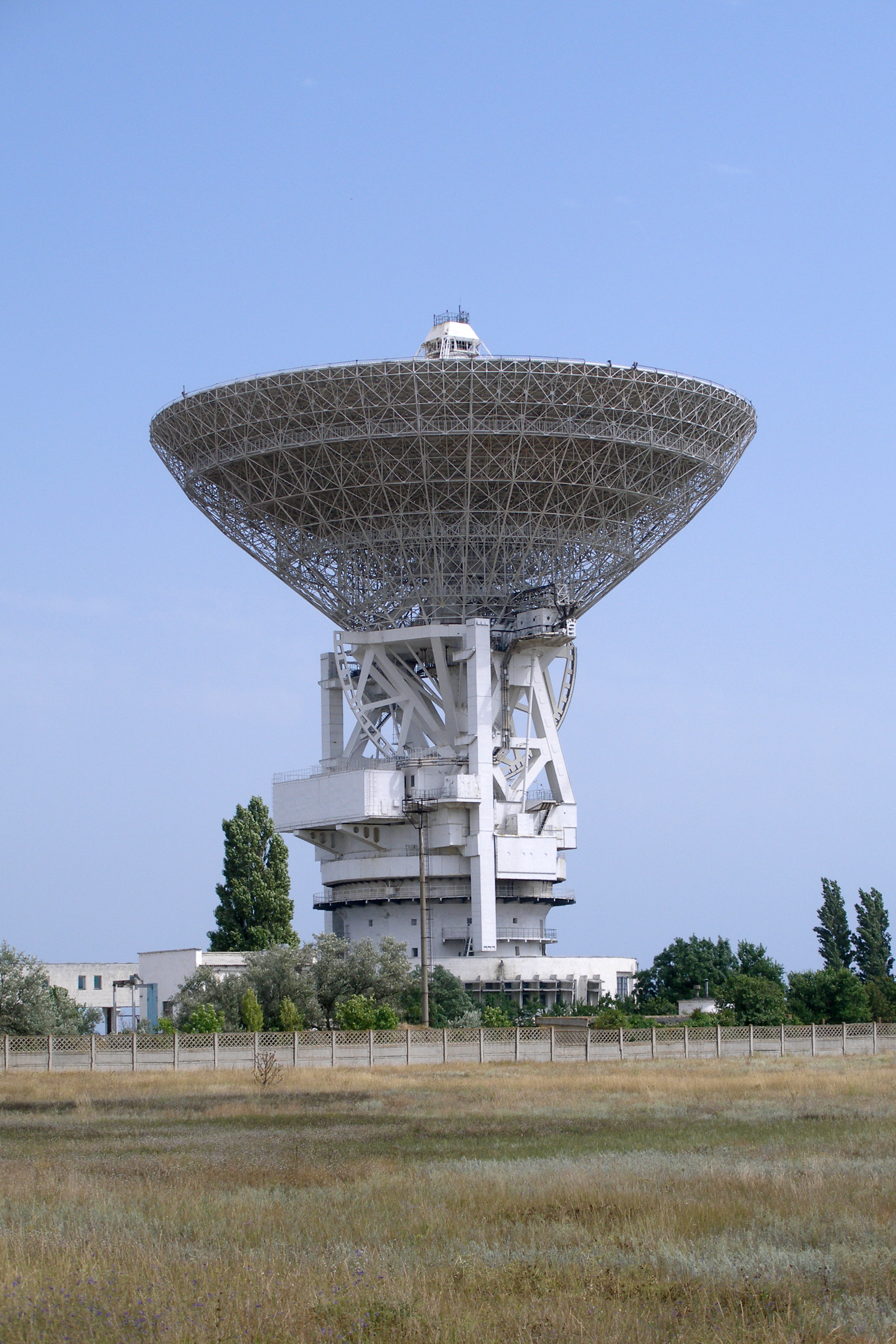
RT-70 in Yevpatoria

Cosmic Call was the name of two sets of interstellar radio messages that were sent from RT-70 in Yevpatoria, Ukraine in 1999 (Cosmic Call 1) and 2003 (Cosmic Call 2) to various nearby stars. The messages were designed with noise-resistant format and characters.

The project was funded by Team Encounter, a Texas-based startup, which went out of business in 2004.

Both transmissions were at ~150 kW, 5.01 GHz (FSK +/-24 kHz).

== Message structure ==
Each Cosmic Call 1 session had the following structure. The Scientific Part (DDM, BM, AM, and ESM) was sent three times (at 100 bit/s), and the Public Part (PP) was sent once (at 2000 bit/s), according to the following arrangement:

DDM → BM → AM → ESM → DDM → BM → AM → ESM → DDM → BM → AM → ESM → PP,

where DDM is the Dutil-Dumas Message, created by Canadian scientists Yvan Dutil and Stéphane Dumas, BM is the Braastad Message, AM is the Arecibo Message, and ESM is the Encounter 2001 Staff Message.

Each Cosmic Call 2 session in 2003 had the following structure:

DDM2 → DDM2 → DDM2 → AM → AM → AM → BIG → BIG → BIG → BM → ESM → PP,

where DDM2 is modernized DDM (aka Interstellar Rosetta Stone, ISR), BIG is Bilingual Image Glossary. All but the PP were transmitted at 400 bit/s

The ISR was 263,906 bits; BM, 88,687 bits, AM, 1,679 bits; BIG was 12 binary images 121,301 bits; ESM 24,899 bits. Total = 500,472 bits for 53 minutes. PP was 220 megabytes and sent at a rate of 100,000 bit/s for 11 hours total.

== Error in Cosmic Call 1 ==
The DDM incorrectly gave the neutron mass as 1.67392, instead of the known value of 1.67492. This error was corrected in DDM2.

== Stars targeted ==
The messages were sent to the following stars:

Name	Constellation	Date sent	Arrival date	Message
16 Cyg A	Cygnus	May 24, 1999	November 2069	Cosmic Call 1
15 Sge	Sagitta	June 30, 1999	February 2057	Cosmic Call 1
HD 178428	Sagitta	June 30, 1999	October 2067	Cosmic Call 1
Gl 777	Cygnus	July 1, 1999	April 2051	Cosmic Call 1
GJ 49	Cassiopeia	July 6, 2003	April 2036	Cosmic Call 2
GJ 208	Orion	July 6, 2003	August 2040	Cosmic Call 2
55 Cnc	Cancer	July 6, 2003	May 2044	Cosmic Call 2
HD 10307	Andromeda	July 6, 2003	September 2044	Cosmic Call 2
47 UMa	Ursa Major	July 6, 2003	May 2049	Cosmic Call 2

== See also ==
- Arecibo message
- Active SETI
- Communication with extraterrestrial intelligence
- List of interstellar radio messages
