= HD 193664 =

Star in the constellation Draco

- Location of HD 193664 (circled in red)

Observation data Epoch J2000.0 Equinox ICRS
- Constellation: Draco
- Right ascension: 20^{h} 17^{m} 31.328^{s}
- Declination: +66° 51′ 13.28″
- Apparent magnitude (V): 5.93

Characteristics
- Evolutionary stage: main sequence
- Spectral type: G3 V
- U−B color index: +0.06
- B−V color index: +0.58

Astrometry
Radial velocity (R_{v})	−4.7 km/s
Proper motion (μ)	RA: +468.684 mas/yr Dec.: +297.589 mas/yr
Parallax (π)	57.2041±0.0208 mas
Distance	57.02 ± 0.02 ly (17.481 ± 0.006 pc)
Absolute magnitude (M_{V})	4.69

Details
Mass	1.04 M_{☉}
Radius	1.03 R_{☉}
Luminosity	1.1 L_{☉}
Surface gravity (log g)	4.45 cgs
Temperature	5,922 K
Metallicity [Fe/H]	−0.13 dex
Rotational velocity (v sin i)	1.3 km/s
Age	3.18 Gyr

Other designations
- BD+66°1281, GJ 788, HD 193664, HIP 100017, HR 7783, SAO 18796

Database references
SIMBAD	data

HD 193664 is a star in the northern constellation of Draco. HD 193664 is its Henry Draper Catalogue designation. With an apparent magnitude of 5.93, according to the Bortle Scale it is visible to the naked eye from suburban skies. Parallax measurements yield an estimated distance of 57 light years. It has a relatively large proper motion of 0.558 arc seconds per year across the sky, and is drifting closer to the Sun with a radial velocity of −4.7 km/s.

This star is considered a solar analog—meaning that it is photometrically analogous to the Sun—and it displays no significant variability. It is a G-type main sequence star with a stellar classification of G3V. Both the mass and radius of HD 193664 differ from those of the Sun by just a few percent, although it has a somewhat lower metallicity. It may be around the same age as the Sun, being an estimated 3.2 billion years old. The effective temperature of the stellar atmosphere is 5,922 K, giving it the yellow-hued glow of a G-type star.

HD 193664 has been examined for signs of an infrared excess that could indicate the presence of a circumstellar disk of dust, but none has been found (as of 2012). This is member of the thin disk population of stars that lie near the galactic plane.
