= HD 76151 =

Star in the constellation Hydra

- Location of HD 76151 (circled in red)

Observation data Epoch J2000.0 Equinox J2000.0 (ICRS)
- Constellation: Hydra
- Right ascension: 08^{h} 54^{m} 17.9471^{s}
- Declination: −05° 26′ 04.054″
- Apparent magnitude (V): 6.00

Characteristics
- Evolutionary stage: Main sequence
- Spectral type: G2V
- U−B color index: +0.22
- B−V color index: +0.67
- R−I color index: +0.21

Astrometry
Radial velocity (R_{v})	31.99±0.12 km/s
Proper motion (μ)	RA: −413.648 mas/yr Dec.: 30.619 mas/yr
Parallax (π)	59.3595±0.0408 mas
Distance	54.95 ± 0.04 ly (16.85 ± 0.01 pc)
Absolute magnitude (M_{V})	+4.81

Details
Mass	1.053+0.056 −0.068 M_{☉}
Radius	1.125+0.035 −0.011 R_{☉}
Surface gravity (log g)	4.35±0.18 cgs
Temperature	5,790±170 K
Metallicity [Fe/H]	0.24±0.09 dex
Rotation	15 days
Rotational velocity (v sin i)	3 km/s
Age	5.5+2.5 −2.1 Gyr

Other designations
- BD−04 2490, GC 12307, GJ 327, HD 76151, HIP 43726, HR 3538, SAO 136389, PPM 191823, LTT 3283, NLTT 20504

Database references
SIMBAD	data

HD 76151 is a high proper motion, G-type main-sequence star and solar analog in the constellation of Hydra 54.95 light-years from Earth. It has an apparent visual magnitude of approximately 6.00, which means it is faintly visible to the naked eye under good viewing conditions. An infrared excess has been detected around this star, most likely indicating the presence of a circumstellar disk at a radius of 7.9 AU. The temperature of this dust is 99 K.

HD 76151 has an age of roughly 5.5 billion years old, with estimates ranging from 3.4 to 9.6 billion years. The stellar atmosphere has an effective temperature of around 5,790 K (5,520 °C; 9,960 °F). The radius of HD 76151 is 1.125 solar radii (783,000 km) based on spectroscopic observations, though Gaia DR3 estimates a radius of 0.977 solar radii (680,000 km). It is slightly metal-rich and is a member of the thin disk population.
