= Gliese 526 =

Star in the constellation Boötes

- Location of Gliese 526 in the constellation Boötes

Observation data Epoch J2000 Equinox ICRS
- Constellation: Boötes
- Right ascension: 13^{h} 45^{m} 43.776^{s}
- Declination: +14° 53′ 29.47″
- Apparent magnitude (V): 8.464

Characteristics
- Spectral type: M1.5 V
- U−B color index: +1.04
- B−V color index: +1.48
- Variable type: Flare star

Astrometry
Radial velocity (R_{v})	+15.58±0.12 km/s
Proper motion (μ)	RA: +1,776.006 mas/yr Dec.: −1,455.156 mas/yr
Parallax (π)	183.9962±0.0253 mas
Distance	17.726 ± 0.002 ly (5.4349 ± 0.0007 pc)
Absolute magnitude (M_{V})	+9.80

Details
Mass	0.472±0.02 M_{☉}
Radius	0.488±0.008 R_{☉}
Luminosity	(3.651±0.127)×10^{−2} L_{☉}
Surface gravity (log g)	4.79±0.07 cgs
Temperature	3,678±51 K
Metallicity [Fe/H]	–0.086 dex
Rotation	48.7±0.3 days
Rotational velocity (v sin i)	1.00 km/s

Other designations
- BD+15°2620, CD+15°2620, HD 119850, HIP 67155, SAO 100695, LAL 25372, PLX 3135, Wolf 498, TYC 899-789-1

Database references
SIMBAD	data

GJ 526 (Lalande 25372, Wolf 498) is a red dwarf star in the northern constellation of Boötes. It has an apparent visual magnitude of 8.5, which is too faint to be seen with the naked eye. Based upon an annual parallax shift of 0.184 arcseconds as measured by the Hipparcos satellite, this system is 17.7 light-years (5.43 parsecs) from Earth.

== History of observations ==
This star is known at least from 1801, when it was included to Lalande's stellar catalogue Histoire céleste française. In 1847 edition of Lalande's catalogue by Francis Baily it was assigned number 25372, since it sometimes designated as Lalande 25372 or LAL 25372.

High proper motion of this star and its large parallax were known at least from 1911, when Frank Schlesinger published a paper where he announced its parallax 152±7 mas and mentioned its proper motion value of 2.3 arcseconds. In 1919, German astronomer Max Wolf included GJ 526 in his catalogue of high-proper-motion stars, giving it the identifier 498.

== Properties ==
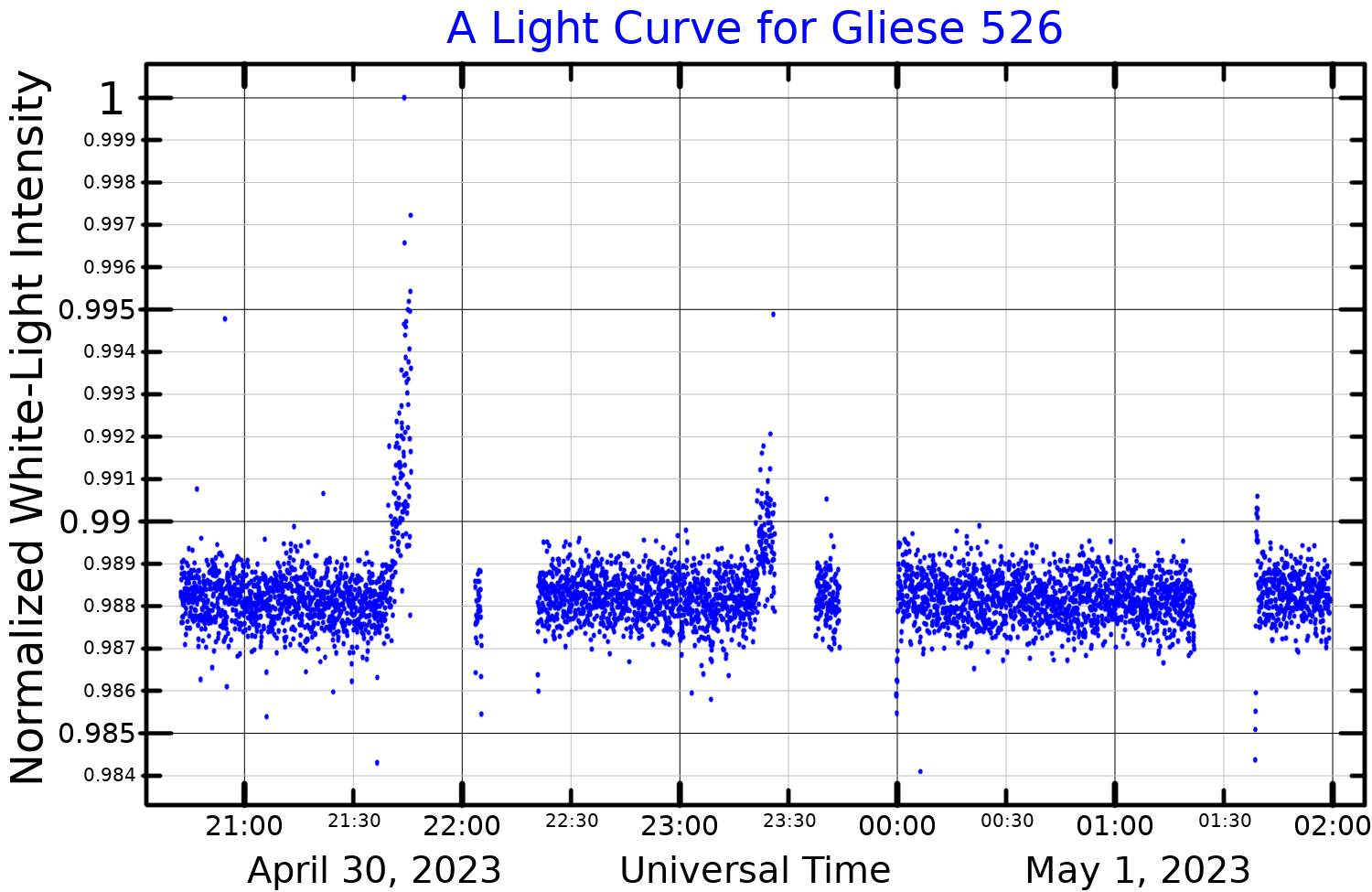
A light curve for Gliese 526, plotted from data published by Bruno et al. (2024)

GJ 526 is a flare star, which means it undergoes sporadic increases in brightness of up to 1–6 magnitudes. It is a main-sequence red dwarf with a stellar classification of M1.5 V. GJ 526 is smaller than the Sun, with 47% of the mass and 49% of the radius. It shines with just 3.6% of the luminosity of the Sun, with its stellar atmosphere radiating at an effective temperature of 3,678 K.

GJ 526 has been examined for an excess of radiation in the infrared. The presence of an infrared excess can be taken as an indication of a debris disk orbiting the star. However, no such excess was discovered around GJ 526.
