= Cosmic language =

Cosmic language may refer to:

- Lincos language, created by Hans Freudenthal
- Cosmical auxiliary language, an auxiliary language meant for communication between different species
- Alien language, hypothetical language of extraterrestrial beings
  - Alien language in science fiction, fictional language of extraterrestrial beings constructed by human

== See also ==
- Astrolinguistics
