= McCowan (surname) =

McCowan is a Scottish surname. Notable people with the surname include:

- Alexander McCowan, Canadian politician
- Anthony McCowan, British barrister and judge
- Luke McCowan, Scottish footballer
- Bob McCowan, Scottish-Australian rugby union player
- Brenda McCowan, behaviorist
- George McCowan, Canadian film and television director
- John McCowan, Scottish physicist
- Teaira McCowan (born 1996), American basketball player
