= Lincos =

Lincos may refer to:

- Lincos language, designed for extraterrestrial contact
- LINCOS, sustainable development project in Costa Rica
