= Communication with extraterrestrial intelligence =

Branch of SETI

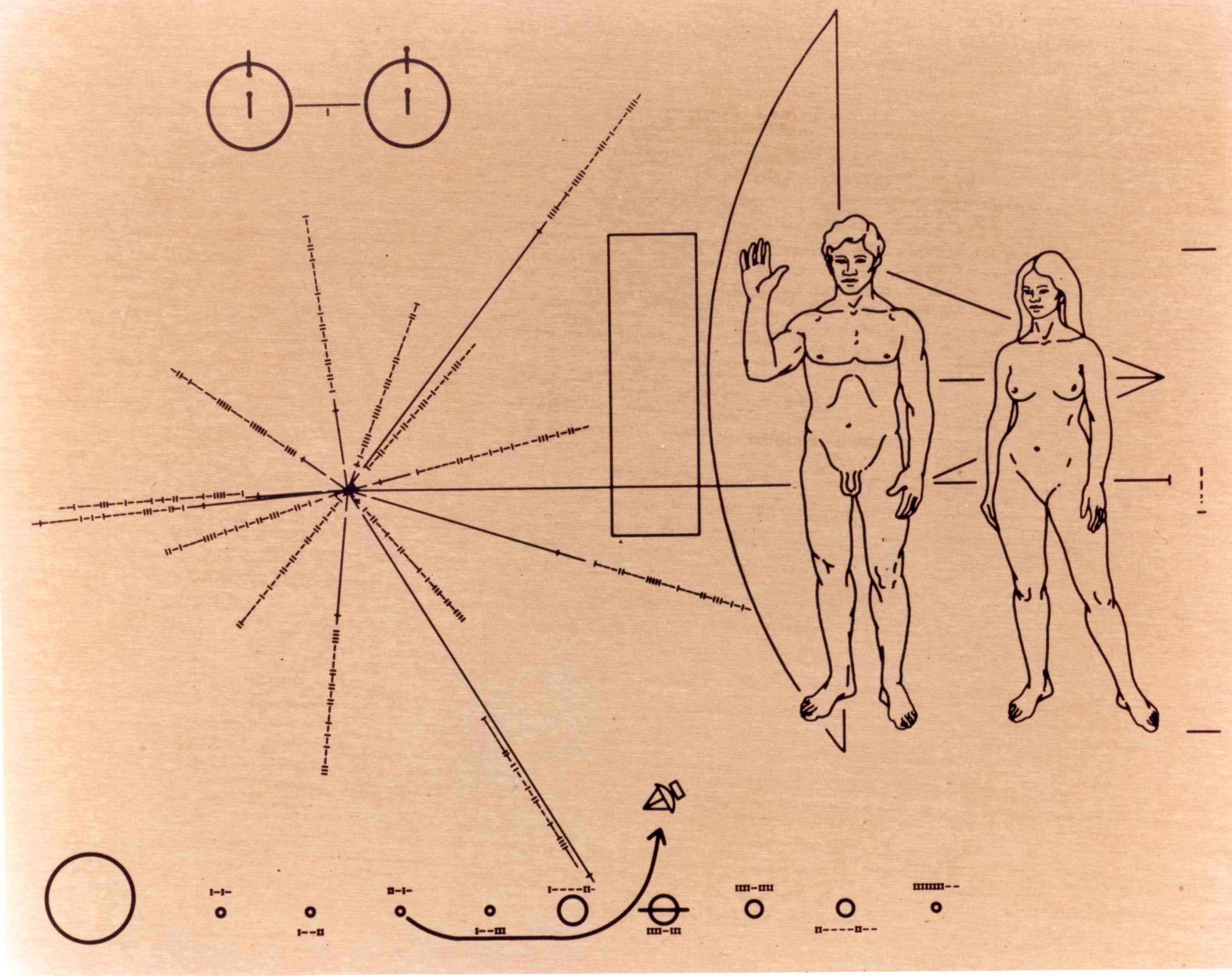
The illustration on the Pioneer plaque

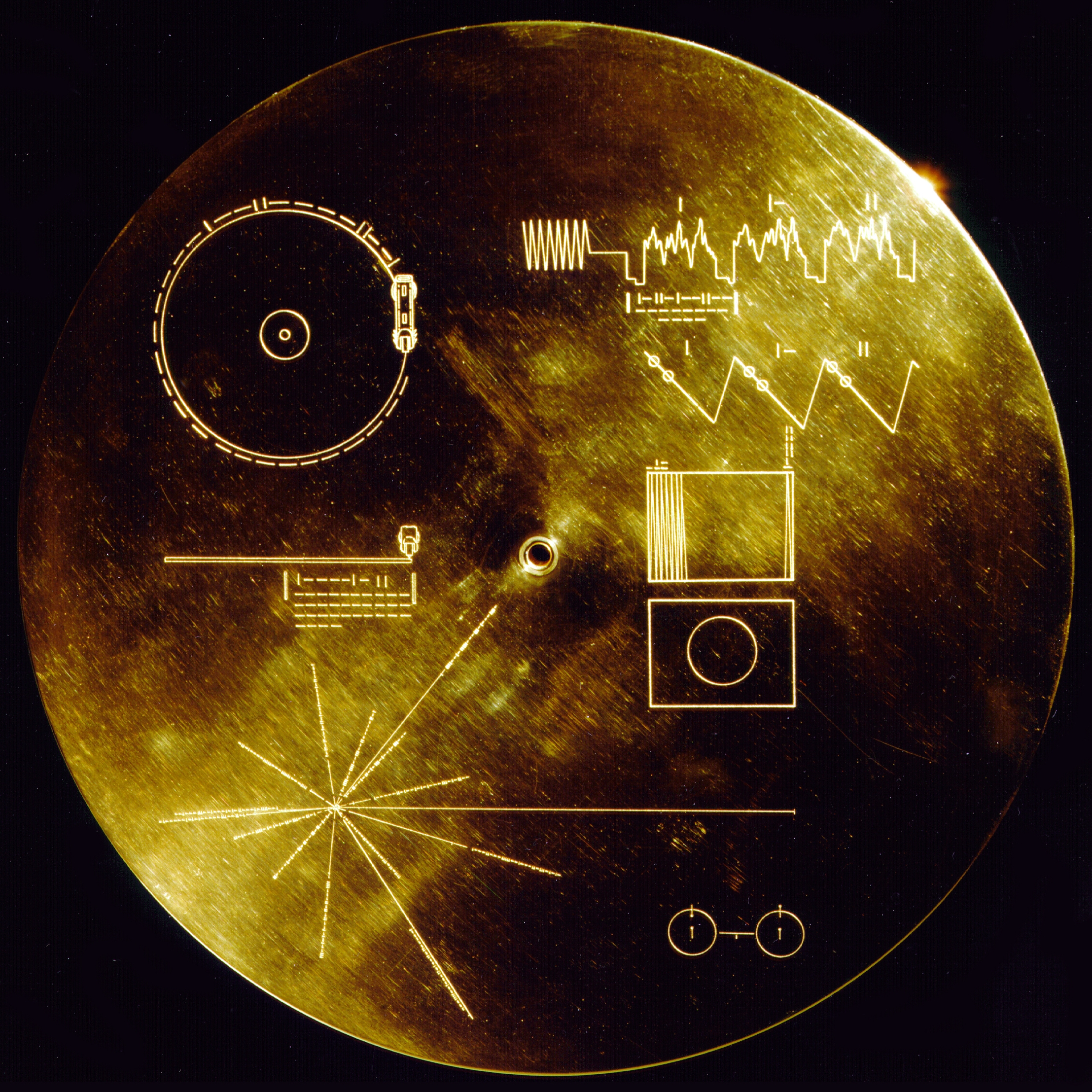
Cover of the Voyager Golden Record

Messages displayed on NASA's interstellar probes: Pioneer 10, Pioneer 11, Voyager 1, and Voyager 2, launched between 1972 and 1977

The communication with extraterrestrial intelligence (CETI) is a branch of the search for extraterrestrial intelligence (SETI) that focuses on composing and deciphering interstellar messages that theoretically could be understood by another technological civilization. The best-known CETI experiment of its kind was the 1974 Arecibo message composed by Frank Drake.

There are multiple independent organizations and individuals engaged in CETI research; the generic application of abbreviations CETI and SETI (search for extraterrestrial intelligence) in this article should not be taken as referring to any particular organization (such as the SETI Institute).

CETI research has focused on four broad areas: mathematical languages, pictorial systems such as the Arecibo message, algorithmic communication systems (ACETI), and computational approaches to detecting and deciphering "natural" language communication. There remain many undeciphered writing systems in human communication, such as Linear A, discovered by archeologists. Much of the research effort is directed at how to overcome similar problems of decipherment that arise in many scenarios of interplanetary communication.

On 13 February 2015, scientists (including Douglas Vakoch, David Grinspoon, Seth Shostak, and David Brin) at an annual meeting of the American Association for the Advancement of Science, discussed active SETI and whether transmitting a message to possible intelligent extraterrestrials in the cosmos was a good idea. That same week, a statement was released, signed by many in the SETI community, that a "worldwide scientific, political, and humanitarian discussion must occur before any message is sent". On 28 March 2015, a related essay was written by Seth Shostak and published in The New York Times.

== History ==
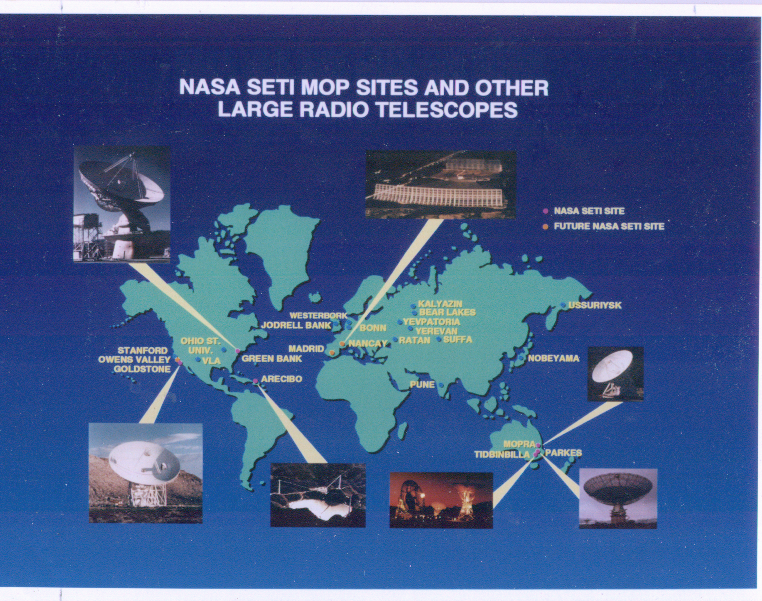
NASA SETI (Search for Extraterrestrial Intelligence) Microwave Observing Project sites in 1992

In the 19th century, many books and articles speculated about the possible inhabitants of other planets. Many people believed that intelligent beings might live on the Moon, Mars, and/or Venus.

Since travel to other planets was not possible at the time, some people suggested ways to signal extraterrestrials even before radio was discovered. Carl Friedrich Gauss is often credited with an 1820 proposal that a giant triangle and three squares, the Pythagoras, could be drawn on the Siberian tundra. The outlines of the shapes would have been ten-mile-wide strips of pine forest, whereas the interiors could be filled with rye or wheat.

Joseph Johann Littrow proposed in 1819 to use the Sahara as a sort of blackboard. Giant trenches several hundred yards wide could delineate twenty-mile-wide shapes. Then the trenches would be filled with water, and then enough kerosene could be poured on top of the water to burn for six hours. Using this method, a different signal could be sent every night.

Illustration of the Pythagorean theorem, that was proposed to be a signal for extraterrestrials. The sum of two squares whose sides are the two legs (blue and red) is equal to the area of the square whose side is the hypotenuse (purple).

Meanwhile, other astronomers were looking for signs of life on other planets. In 1822, Franz von Paula Gruithuisen thought he saw a giant city and evidence of agriculture on the Moon, but astronomers using more powerful instruments refuted his claims. Gruithuisen also believed he saw evidence of life on Venus. Ashen light had previously been observed on the dark side of Venus, and he postulated that it was caused by a great fire festival put on by the inhabitants to celebrate their new emperor. Later he revised his position, stating that the Venusians could be burning their rainforest to make more farmland.

By the late 1800s, the possibility of life on the Moon was put to rest. Astronomers at that time believed in the Kant-Laplace hypothesis, which stated that the farthest planets from the sun are the oldest – therefore Mars was more likely to have advanced civilizations than Venus. Subsequent investigations focused on contacting Martians. In 1877, Giovanni Schiaparelli announced he had discovered "canali" ("channels" in Italian, which occur naturally, and mistranslated as "canals", which are artificial) on Mars. This was followed by thirty years of enthusiasm about the possibility of life on Mars. Eventually the Martian canals proved illusory.

The inventor Charles Cros was convinced that pinpoints of light observed on Mars and Venus were the lights of large cities. He spent years of his life trying to get funding for a giant mirror with which to signal the Martians. The mirror would be focused on the Martian desert, where the intense reflected sunlight could be used to burn figures into the Martian sand.

Inventor Nikola Tesla mentioned many times during his career that he thought his inventions such as his Tesla coil, used in the role of a "resonant receiver", could be used to communicate with other planets, and that he even had observed repetitive signals of what he believed were extraterrestrial radio communications coming from Venus or Mars in 1899. These "signals" turned out to be terrestrial radiation, however.

Around 1900, the Guzman Prize was created; the first person to establish interplanetary communication would be awarded 100,000 francs, under one stipulation: Mars was excluded because Madame Guzman thought communicating with Mars would be too easy to deserve a prize.

== Mathematical and scientific languages ==
=== Lincos (Lingua cosmica) ===
Published in 1960 by Hans Freudenthal, Lincos: Design of a Language for Cosmic Intercourse, expands upon Astraglossa to create a general-purpose language derived from basic mathematics and logic symbols. Several researchers have expanded further upon Freudenthal's work. A dictionary resembling Lincos was featured in the Carl Sagan novel Contact and its film adaptation.

=== Astraglossa ===
Published in 1963 by Lancelot Hogben, "Astraglossa" is an essay describing a system for combining numbers and operators in a series of short and long pulses. In Hogben's system, short pulses represent numbers, while trains of long pulses represent symbols for addition, subtraction, etc.

=== Carl Sagan ===
In the 1985 science fiction novel Contact, Carl Sagan explored in some depth how a message might be constructed to allow communication with an alien civilization, using prime numbers as a starting point, followed by various universal principles and facts of mathematics and science.

Sagan also edited a nonfiction book on the subject. An updated collection of articles on the same topic was published in 2011.

=== A language based on the fundamental facts of science ===
Published in 1992 by Carl Devito and Richard Oehrle, A language based on the fundamental facts of science is a paper describing a language similar in syntax to Astraglossa and Lincos, but which builds its vocabulary around known physical properties.

=== Busch general-purpose binary language used in Lone Signal transmissions ===
In 2010, Michael W. Busch created a general-purpose binary language later used in the Lone Signal project to transmit crowdsourced messages to extraterrestrial intelligence (METI). This was followed by an attempt to extend the syntax used in the Lone Signal hailing message to communicate in a way that, while neither mathematical nor strictly logical, was nonetheless understandable given the prior definition of terms and concepts in the Lone Signal hailing message.

Name	Designation	Constellation	Date sent	Arrival date	Message
Gliese 526	HD 119850	Boötes	July 10, 2013	2031	Lone Signal

== Pictorial messages ==
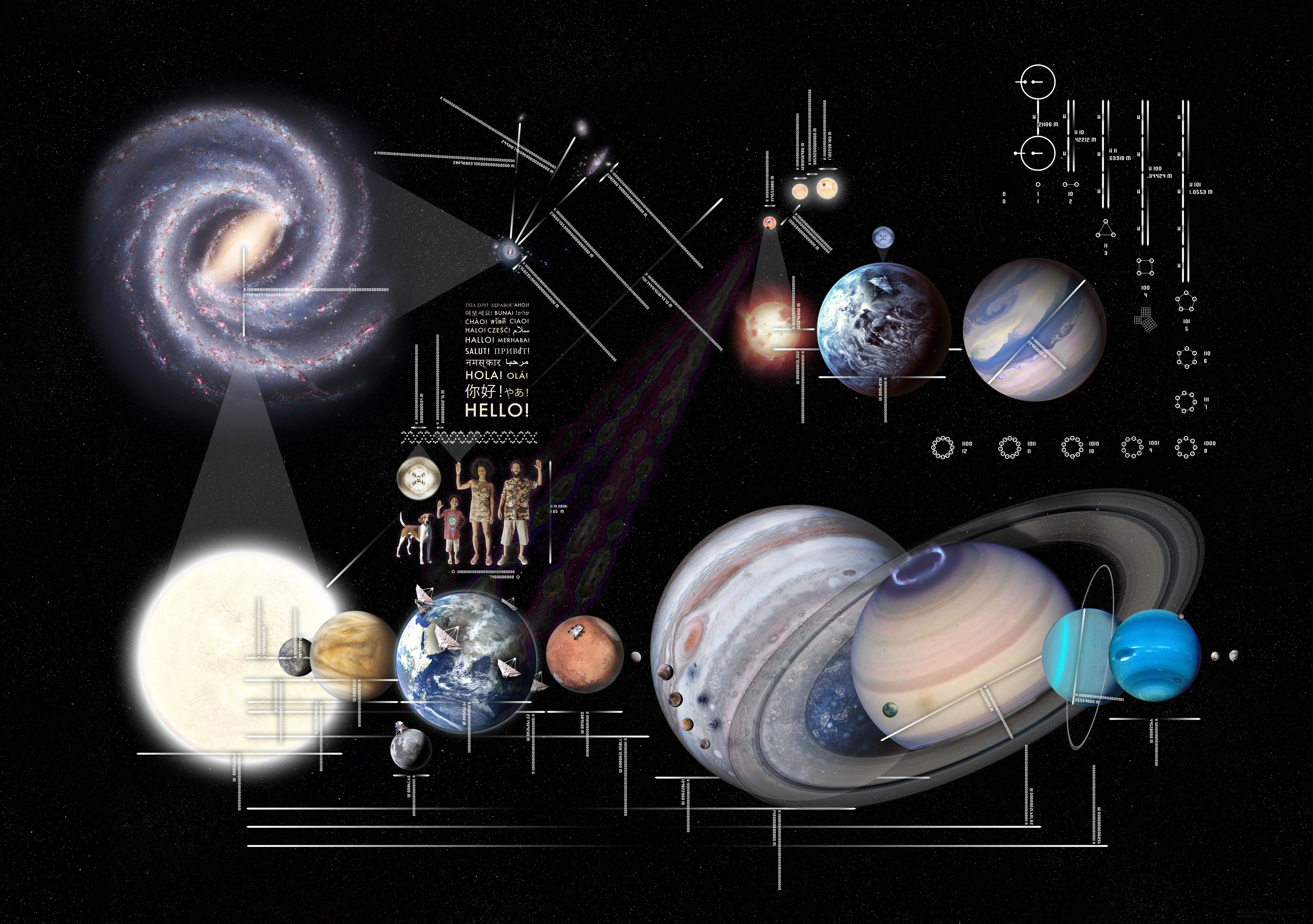
Example of a high-resolution pictorial message to potential extraterrestrial intelligence at Proxima Centauri

Pictorial communication systems seek to describe fundamental mathematical or physical concepts via simplified diagrams sent as bitmaps. These messages necessarily assume that the recipient has similar visual capabilities and can understand basic mathematics and geometry. A common critique of pictorial systems is that they presume a shared understanding of special shapes, which may not be the case with a species with substantially different vision, and therefore a different way of interpreting visual information. For instance, an arrow representing the movement of some object might be misinterpreted as a weapon firing.

=== Pioneer probes ===
Two etched plaques, known as the Pioneer plaques, were included aboard the Pioneer 10 and Pioneer 11 spacecraft when they launched in 1972 and 1973. These were the idea of astronomers Eric Burgess and Sagan, with contributions from Drake, Linda Salzman, and Jon Lomberg. The plaques depict the specific location of the Solar System within the galaxy and the Earth within the Solar System, as well as the form of the human body.

=== Voyager probes ===
Launched in 1977, the Voyager probes carried two golden records that were inscribed with diagrams similar to the Pioneer plaques, depicting the human form, the Solar System, and its location. Also included were recordings of images and sounds from Earth. While the motivating factor originated from Voyager project manager John R. Casani, the idea of formatting it as a record was the work of Sagan, Drake, Salzman, Lomberg and their colleagues.

=== Arecibo message ===
The Arecibo message, transmitted in 1974, was a 1,679-pixel bitmap created by Drake that, when properly arranged into 73 rows and 23 columns, shows the numbers one through ten; the atomic numbers of hydrogen, carbon, nitrogen, oxygen, and phosphorus; the formulas for the sugars and bases that make up the nucleotides of DNA; the number of nucleotides in the human genome; the double helix structure of DNA; a simple illustration of a human being and its height; the human population of Earth; a diagram of the Solar System; and an illustration of the Arecibo telescope with its diameter.

=== Cosmic Call messages ===
The Cosmic Call messages consisted of a few digital sections – "Rosetta Stone", a copy of the Arecibo Message, the Bilingual Image Glossary, and the Braastad message – as well as text, audio, video, and other image files submitted for transmission by people around the world. The "Rosetta Stone" was composed by Stéphane Dumas and Yvan Dutil, and represents a multi-page bitmap that builds a vocabulary of symbols representing numbers and mathematical operations. The message proceeds from basic mathematics to progressively more complex concepts, including physical processes and objects (such as a hydrogen atom). The message was designed with a noise-resistant format and characters that make it resistant to alteration by noise. These messages were transmitted in 1999 and 2003 from Evpatoria Planetary Radar in Ukraine under the scientific guidance of Alexander L. Zaitsev. Richard Braastad coordinated the overall project.

Star systems to which the messages were sent include the following:

Name	Designation HD	Constellation	Date sent	Arrival date	Message
16 Cyg A	HD 186408	Cygnus	May 24, 1999	November 2069	Cosmic Call 1
15 Sge	HD 190406	Sagitta	June 30, 1999	February 2057	Cosmic Call 1
	HD 178428	Sagitta	June 30, 1999	October 2067	Cosmic Call 1
Gl 777	HD 190360	Cygnus	July 1, 1999	April 2051	Cosmic Call 1
	Hip 4872	Cassiopeia	July 6, 2003	April 2036	Cosmic Call 2
	HD 245409	Orion	July 6, 2003	August 2040	Cosmic Call 2
55 Cnc	HD 75732	Cancer	July 6, 2003	May 2044	Cosmic Call 2
	HD 10307	Andromeda	July 6, 2003	September 2044	Cosmic Call 2
47 UMa	HD 95128	Ursa Major	July 6, 2003	May 2049	Cosmic Call 2

== Multi-modal messages ==
=== Teen-Age Message ===
The Teen-Age Message, composed by Russian scientists (Zaitsev, Gindilis, Pshenichner, Filippova) and teens, was transmitted from the 70-m dish of Evpatoria Deep Space Center in Ukraine to six star systems resembling that of the Sun on August 29 and September 3 and 4, 2001. The message consists of three parts:

Section 1 represents a coherent-sounding radio signal with slow Doppler wavelength tuning to imitate transmission from the Sun's center. This signal was transmitted in order to help extraterrestrials detect the TAM and diagnose the radio propagation effect of the interstellar medium.

Section 2 is analog information representing musical melodies performed on the theremin. This electric musical instrument produces a quasi-monochromatic signal, which is easily detectable across interstellar distances. There were seven musical compositions in the First Theremin Concert for Aliens. The 14-minute analog transmission of the theremin concert would take almost 50 hours by digital means; see The First Musical Interstellar Radio Message.

Section 3 represents a well-known Arecibo-like binary digital information: the logotype of the TAM, bilingual Russian and English greeting to aliens, and image glossary.

Star systems to which the message was sent are the following:

Name	HD designation	Constellation	Date sent	Arrival date
	197076	Delphinus	August 29, 2001	February 2070
47 UMa	95128	Ursa Major	September 3, 2001	July 2047
37 Gem	50692	Gemini	September 3, 2001	December 2057
	126053	Virgo	September 3, 2001	January 2059
	76151	Hydra	September 4, 2001	May 2057
	193664	Draco	September 4, 2001	January 2059

=== Cosmic Call 2 (Cosmic Call 2003) message ===
The Cosmic Call-2 message contained text, images, video, music, the Dutil/Dumas message, a copy of the 1974 Arecibo message, BIG = Bilingual Image Glossary, the AI program Ella, and the Braastad message.

== Algorithmic messages ==
Algorithmic communication systems are a relatively new field within CETI. In these systems, which build upon early work on mathematical languages, the sender describes a small set of mathematic and logic symbols that form the basis for a rudimentary programming language that the recipient can run on a virtual machine. Algorithmic communication has a number of advantages over static pictorial and mathematical messages, including: localized communication (the recipient can probe and interact with the programs within a message, without transmitting a reply to the sender and then waiting years for a response), forward error correction (the message might contain algorithms that process data elsewhere in the message), and the ability to embed proxy agents within the message. In principle, a sophisticated program when run on a fast enough computing substrate, may exhibit complex behavior and perhaps, intelligence.

=== CosmicOS ===
CosmicOS, designed by Paul Fitzpatrick at MIT, describes a virtual machine that is derived from lambda calculus.

=== Logic Gate Matrices ===
Logic Gate Matrices (a.k.a. LGM), developed by Brian McConnell, describes a universal virtual machine that is constructed by connecting coordinates in an n-dimensional space via mathematics and logic operations, for example: (1,0,0) <-- (OR (0,0,1) (0,0,2)). Using this method, one may describe an arbitrarily complex computing substrate as well as the instructions to be executed on it.

== Natural language messages ==
This research focuses on the event that we receive a signal or message that is either not directed at us (eavesdropping) or one that is in its natural communicative form. To tackle this difficult scenario, methods are being developed that will detect if a signal has structure indicative of an intelligent source, categorize the type of structure detected, and then decipher its content, from its physical level encoding and patterns to the parts-of-speech that encode internal and external ontologies.

Primarily, this structure modeling focuses on the search for generic human and inter-species language universals to devise computational methods by which language may be discriminated from non-language, and core structural syntactic elements of unknown languages may be detected. Aims of this research include contributing to the understanding of language structure and the detection of intelligent language-like features in signals, in order to aid the search for extraterrestrial intelligence.

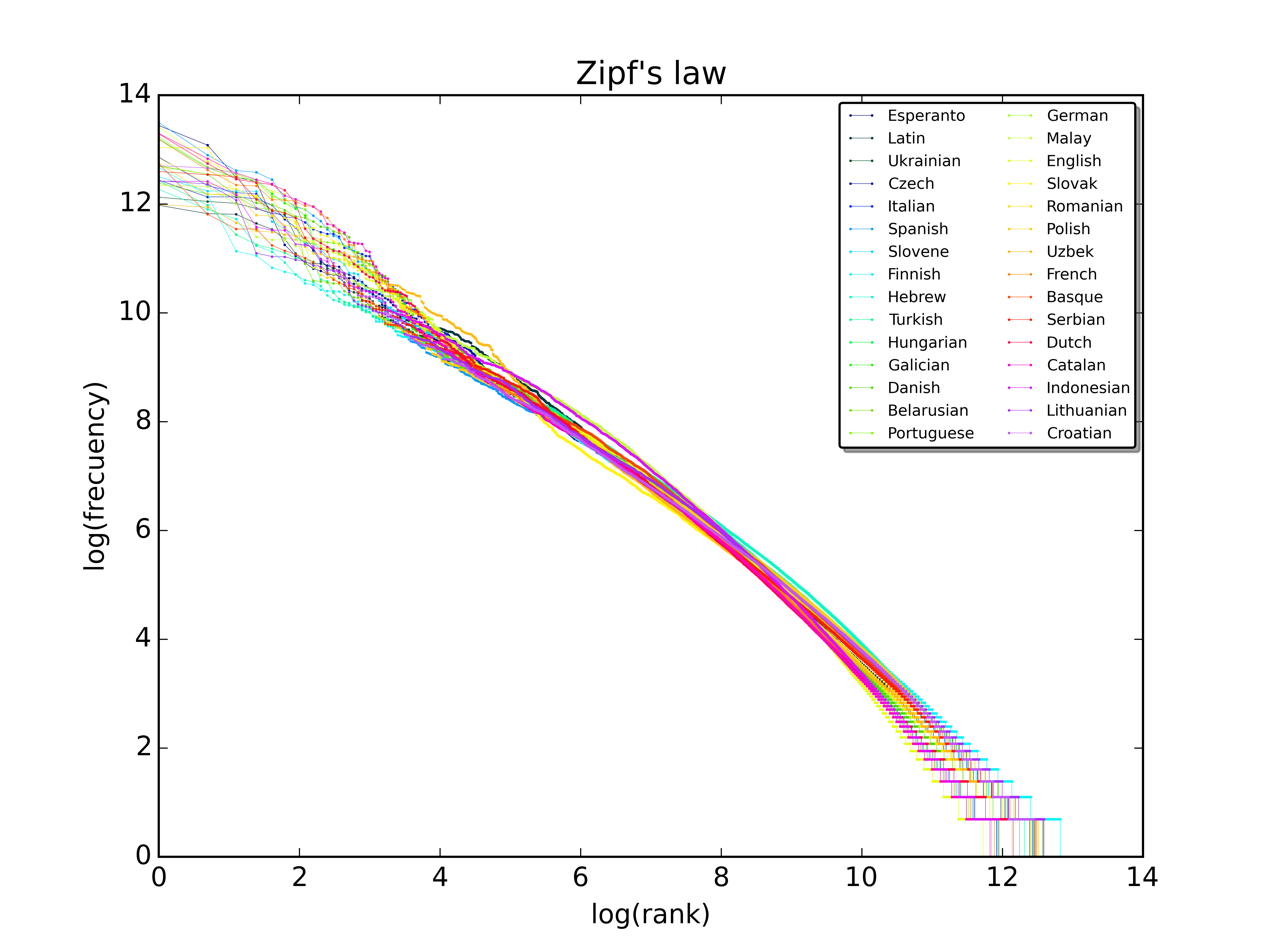
A plot of the rank versus frequency for the first 10 million words in 30 Wikipedias (dumps from October 2015) in a log-log scale

The problem goal is therefore to separate language from non-language without dialogue, and learn something about the structure of language in the passing. The language may not be human (animals, aliens, computers, etc.), the perceptual space may be unknown, and human language structure cannot be presumed, but must begin somewhere. The language signal should be approached from a naive viewpoint, increasing ignorance and assuming as little as possible.

If a sequence can be tokenized, that is, separated into "words", an unknown human language may be distinguished from many other data sequences by the frequency distribution of the tokens. Human languages conform to a Zipfian distribution, while many (but not all) other data sequences do not. It has been proposed that an alien language also might conform to such a distribution. When displayed in a log-log graph of frequency vs. rank, this distribution would appear as a somewhat straight line with a slope of approximately -1. SETI scientist Laurance Doyle explains that the slope of a line that represents individual tokens in a stream of tokens may indicate whether the stream contains linguistic or other structured content. If the line angles at 45°, the stream contains such content. If the line is flat, it does not.

== CETI researchers ==
- Frank Drake (SETI Institute): SETI pioneer, composed the Arecibo message.
- Dr John Elliott: research into developing strategies, which are based on receiving a 'natural' language message, that look at developing algorithms to detect if an ET signal has intelligent-like structure and if so, then how to decipher its content. Author of many papers in this area and a contributor to SETI's book on interstellar communication. Other contributions include message design and construction; member of: International Academy of Astronautics, SETI Permanent Study Group; International Task Group for the Post-detection identification of unknown radio signals.
- Laurence Doyle (SETI Institute): studies animal communication, and has developed statistical measures of complexity in animal utterances as well as human language.
- Stephane Dumas: developed Cosmic Call messages, as well as a general technique for generating 2-D symbols that remain recognizable even if corrupted by noise.
- Yvan Dutil: developed Cosmic Call messages with Stephane Dumas.
- Paul Fitzpatrick (MIT): developed CosmicOS system based on lambda calculus
- Brian McConnell: developed framework for algorithmic communication systems (ACETI) from 2000 to 2002.
- Marvin Minsky (MIT AI researcher): Believes that aliens may think similarly to humans because of shared constraints, permitting communication. First proposed the idea of including algorithms within an interstellar message.
- Carl Sagan: co-authored the Arecibo message and was heavily involved in SETI throughout his life.
- Douglas Vakoch (METI): editor of Archaeology, Anthropology, and Interstellar Communication, a 2014 essay collection on CETI.
- Alexander Zaitsev (IRE, Russia): composed Teen Age Message with Boris Pshenichner, Lev Gindilis, Lilia Filippova, et al., composed Bilingual Image Glossary for Cosmic Call 2003 Message, Scientific Manager of transmitting from Evpatoria Planetary Radar the Cosmic Call 1999, the Teen Age Message 2001, and the Cosmic Call 2003, Scientific consultant for A Message From Earth project.
- Michael W. Busch: (Lone Signal) created the binary encoding system for the ongoing Lone Signal hailing message.
- Jacob Haqq Misra: (Lone Signal) is the chief science officer for the ongoing Lone Signal active SETI project.

== Interspecies communication ==
Some researchers have concluded that in order to communicate with extraterrestrial species, humanity must first try to communicate with Earth's intelligent animal species. John C. Lilly worked with interspecies communication by teaching dolphins English (successful with rhythms, not with understandability, given their different mouth/blowhole shapes). He practiced various disciplines of spirituality and also ingested psychedelic drugs such as LSD and (later) ketamine in the company of dolphins. He tried to determine whether he could communicate non-verbally with dolphins, and also tried to determine if some extraterrestrial radio signals are intelligent communications. Similarly, Laurance Doyle, Robert Freitas and Brenda McCowan compare the complexity of cetacean and human languages to help determine whether a specific signal from space is complex enough to represent a message that needs to be decoded.

== See also ==
- Active SETI
- Animal language
- Astrolinguistics
- Dark forest hypothesis, the idea that planetary civilizations remain silent to avoid the possibility of contact with potentially aggressive worlds
- Human–animal communication
- Nexus for Exoplanet System Science
- Pioneer plaque
- SETIcon
- Time capsule
- Waterhole (radio)
- Wow! Signal
