= Lincos language =

Constructed language

Lincos
- Created by: Hans Freudenthal
- Date: 1960
- Setting and usage: search for extraterrestrial intelligence
- Purpose: Constructed language: engineered language; Lincos
- Sources: a priori

Language codes
- ISO 639-3: None (mis)
- Glottolog: None
- IETF: art-x-lincos

Lincos (an abbreviation of the Latin phrase lingua cosmica) is a constructed language first described in 1960 by Dr. Hans Freudenthal in his book Lincos: Design of a Language for Cosmic Intercourse, Part 1. It is a language designed to be understandable by any possible intelligent extraterrestrial life form, for use in interstellar radio transmissions. Freudenthal considered that such a language should be easily understood by beings not acquainted with any Earthling syntax or language. Lincos was designed to be capable of encapsulating "the whole bulk of our knowledge".

== Concepts and range ==
The Lincos "dictionary" is intended to be transmitted first before any additional messages. It teaches natural numbers by a series of repeated pulses, separated by pauses. It then teaches >, <, =, +, -, by examples such as . . . . . > . . . (an extended pause is shown around > in this example so as to suggest to an alien that > is a new separate symbol; otherwise, an alien might think that the whole pattern is a new symbol of unknown meaning). In introducing =, unary notation is shown for numbers: . = 1, . . = 2, and so on. This progresses to multiplication, division, variables, and constants, then propositional logic, set theory, and first-order logic. The dictionary tries to introduce questions by leaving mathematical expressions unsolved (e.g., ? x x + 101 = 11).

The next section of the Lincos dictionary introduces a word for second, "Sec", by playing pulses of various lengths, followed by Sec, and the number of seconds, "until the receiver may be expected to remark that the numbers... are proportional to the durations", thus teaching both that Sec is a unit of time, and exactly how long it is. It then introduces means for measuring durations, referring to moments in time, and talking about past and future events.

Freudenthal's third section is perhaps the most complex, and attempts to convey the concepts and language necessary to describe behavior and conversation between individuals. It uses examples to introduce actors speaking to each other, asking questions, disapproving, quoting other people, knowing and wanting things, promising, and playing. The first steps (having already introduced sets of numbers and questions) are to introduce some new symbols (distinctive patterns of pulses), say that they are NOT numbers, and transmit sequences showing two of these new symbols separated by the word "Inq" (inquiry), followed by a question about an equation, then the symbols reversed, followed by the answer (example below). It is thus expected that, after many repetitions, the recipient will determine that these new symbols are entities asking and answering the questions, rather than some other context for the questions.

Finally, the fourth section describes the concepts and language relating to mass, space, and motion. This last section goes so far as to describe physical features of human beings and of the Solar System.

A second book by Freudenthal, planned but never written, would have added four more sections to the dictionary: "Matter", "Earth", "Life", and "Behavior 2". Other researchers have since extended the language somewhat on their own. One example is CosmicOS. Another is a second-generation Lingua Cosmica developed by the Dutch-Swedish astronomer and mathematician Alexander Ollongren of Leiden University, using constructive logic.

Freudenthal's book on Lincos discusses it with many technical words from linguistic and logical theory, usually without defining them, which may have reduced its general interest, though the main chapters can be understood without these technical terms: appellatives, binding, formalization, function, lexicology, logistical, ostensive, quasi-general, semantics, syntax, variables, etc.

== Use ==
For decades, no actual transmissions were made using Lincos; it remained largely a theoretical exercise, until Canadian astrophysicists Yvan Dutil and Stéphane Dumas, working at the Canadian Defense Research Establishment, created a noise-resistant coding system for messages aimed at communicating with extraterrestrial civilizations. In 1999, the astrophysicists encoded a message in Lincos and used the Yevpatoria RT-70 radio telescope in Ukraine to beam it towards close stars. This is known as Cosmic Call. The experiment was repeated (using other close stars as target) in 2003. The message was a series of pages describing some basic mathematics, physics and astronomy. The Dutil–Dumas experiment was promoted by an organization called Encounter 2001.

Some researchers have explored the similar issues in communicating with intelligent animals such as cetaceans. Lincos messages (even if sent by pulses of sound rather than radio) are complex and need to reach the most patient, logically oriented members of the target species. A far simpler approach aimed at average members of a species can cover numbers, >, <, =, +, -, and time.

== Examples ==
An example of Lincos from section 3 of Freudenthal's book, showing one individual asking another individual questions:

Lincos text	Meaning
Ha Inq Hb ?x 2x=5	Ha says to Hb: What is the x such that 2x=5?
Hb Inq Ha 5/2	Hb says to Ha: 5/2.
Ha Inq Hb Ben	Ha says to Hb: Good.
Ha Inq Hb ?x 4x=10	Ha says to Hb: What is the x such that 4x=10?
Hb Inq Ha 10/4	Hb says to Ha: 10/4.
Ha Inq Hb Mal	Ha says to Hb: Bad.
Hb Inq Ha 1/4	Hb says to Ha: 1/4.
Ha Inq Hb Mal	Ha says to Hb: Bad.
Hb Inq Ha 5/2	Hb says to Ha: 5/2.
Ha Inq Hb Ben	Ha says to Hb: Good.

Note the difference between "good" and "bad" as compared to "true" and "false"; 10/4 is a true answer to the question, so Ver ("true") would be a valid response, but since it wasn't reduced to lowest terms, it wasn't what Ha wanted and so he responded Mal ("bad") instead. The book separately teaches Ver and Fal for true and false.

Another example, showing meta-conversation:

Lincos text	Meaning
Ha Inq Hb ?x 4x=10	Ha says to Hb: What is the x such that 4x=10?
Hb Inq Hc ?y y Inq Hb ?x 4x=10	Hb says to Hc: Who asked me for the x such that 4x=10?
Hc Inq Hb Ha	Hc says to Hb: Ha.

== See also ==
- Active SETI
- Alien language
- METI (Messaging Extraterrestrial Intelligence)
- SETI

== Bibliography ==
- Freudenthal, Hans (1960). Lincos: Design of a Language for Cosmic Intercourse. Amsterdam: North-Holland.
- Ollongren, Alexander (2013). Astrolinguistics. New York: Springer. Bibcode:2013adls.book.....O.
