= Stéphane Dumas =

Stéphane Dumas may refer to:

- Stéphane Dumas (basketball) (born 1978), French basketball coach and player
- Stéphane Dumas (astrophysicist) (1970–2016), Canadian astrophysicist
