= Joe Davis (artist) =

American scientist and artist

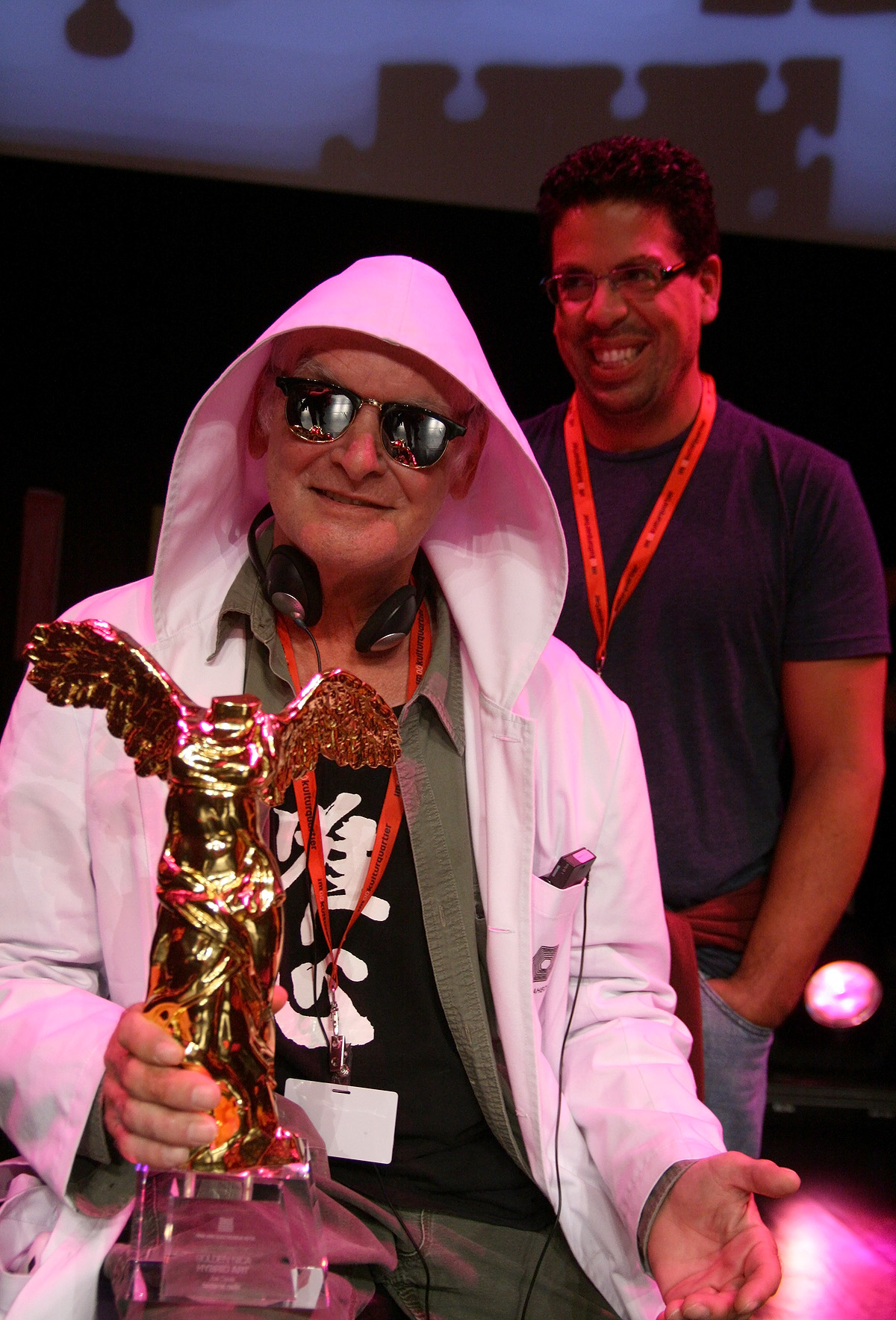
Davis with the '"Golden Nica" of the Prix Ars Electronica 2012 for his Bacterial Radio

Joe Davis (born 1950) is a research affiliate in the Department of Biology at MIT, and in the George Church Laboratory at Harvard Medical School. His research and art includes work in the fields of BioArt (using molecular biology and bioinformatics), "space art", and sculpture, using media including centrifuges, radios, prosthetics, magnetic fields, and genetic material. Davis' teaching positions have been at MIT, the Rhode Island School of Design (RISD), and the University of Kentucky.

Davis' works include the sculpture Earth Sphere, a landmark fog fountain at Kendall Square, Cambridge, Massachusetts, near the MIT campus; RuBisCo Stars, a transmission of a message to nearby stars from the Arecibo Observatory radiotelescope in Puerto Rico, carried out in November 2009; New Age Ruby Falls, a project to create an artificial aurora using a 100,000 watt electron beam fired into the magnetosphere from a NASA space shuttle (which has not yet been carried out); and Microvenus, a piece of symbolic art involving engineering the genetic code of a microbe (one of the first uses of DNA digital data storage).

== Significance ==
Davis' work has been featured in scientific journals, art magazines, and mainstream media—including Scientific American, Nature magazine, and several books. Additionally, Davis has contributed to projects associated with the DIYbio movement . He is frequently invited to speak at universities, labs, and art institutes. Davis' life was further detailed in a feature-length documentary entitled Heaven+Earth+Joe Davis. Davis has had many media appearances, including twice on the Colbert Report. A segment was also produced on Nova. In 2001, the Washington Post termed Davis the "éminence grise of the 'bioart' movement", saying further, "Davis eschews the art versus science argument, insisting that he speaks both languages and could not possibly tear the two disciplines apart in his own mind".

Davis' work has further significance in documenting and critiquing early attempts at steganographic encoding of culturally important messages and images for future generations or extraterrestrial cultures. Davis has stated that he does not wish to create "green rabbits or purple dogs", but rather to manipulate the reams of silent, "junk DNA" that comprise more than 90% of an organism's genetic code.

== Other works ==
- Audio Microscope - a microscope that translates light information into sound allowing the observer to "hear" living cells, each with its own "acoustic signature".
- Experiments with how E. coli respond to jazz and other sounds with Adam Zaretsky.
- Putting a map of the Milky Way into the ear of a transgenic mouse.
- "Primordial" clocks - a project surrounding a theory that life spontaneously self-assembled.
- Plans for channeling lightning bolts into a pulsed laser of almost unparalleled energy and into towering sculptures that would change the bolts' color and emit incredibly loud tones.
- Poetica Vaginal - an interstellar signal briefly transmitted from the MIT Millstone Radar. He converted vaginal contractions into an analog signal and digitally mapped the input into a phoenetic audible representation (or voice). The project was able to send out a few test signals consisting of this data to the intended targets; however, the US Air Force shut down the project before it sent out the bulk of the message.
- Malus ecclesia - encoding the English Wikipedia into the apple tree genome to create a living, literal tree of knowledge.
- Swan Song - sending a radio morse code message back to 1935, via the extreme Kerr rotating black hole, Cygnus X-1, with a nod to the H.G. Wells 1937 novel, Star Begotten, whose protagonist is Joseph Davis.
