= Alexander Ollongren =

Dutch scientist (1928–2025)

Jonkheer Alexander Ollongren
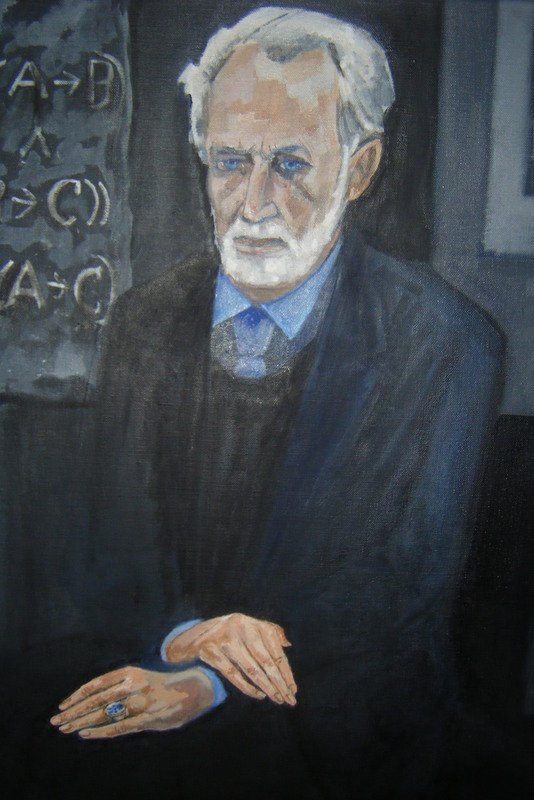
- Portrait of Alexander Ollongren, by Janus Nuiten
- Born: 9 November 1928; Kepahiang Indah, Sumatra, Dutch East Indies
- Died: 25 March 2025 (aged 96); Oegstgeest, Netherlands
- Education: Leiden University
- Spouse: Gunvor Lundgren (m. 1965)
- Children: 2, including Kajsa Ollongren
- Scientific career
- Fields: Mathematics, physics and astronomy
- Workplaces: Leiden University; Yale University

Jonkheer Alexander Ollongren (9 November 1928 – 25 March 2025) was a Dutch scientist and academic who was professor emeritus at Leiden University. He served on the Advisory Council of METI (Messaging Extraterrestrial Intelligence).

== Early life ==
Alexander Ollongren was born on 9 November 1928, on a coffee plantation in Kepahiang, in the southwestern part of Sumatra, Netherlands East Indies. His father, Alexander Ollongren (1901–1989), was born in Kyiv in Kiev Governorate, and was of mixed Finnish and Swedish descent. He was a member of the Finnish noble family Ållongren. His mother, Selma Hedwig Adèle Jaeger (1901–2000), was of Dutch and German heritage. The family moved to Java in early 1932 and lived in Yogyakarta, while the Japanese army occupied the Netherlands East Indies in 1942. In 1945, the family was interned at various Japanese internment camps, most notably Fort van den Bosch in the modern Ngawi Regency.

== Education ==
After the war, Ollongren was further educated in Jakarta. The family stayed in Australia for six months in order to recuperate and later moved to the Netherlands where Ollongren decided to enroll in Leiden University.

His education at Leiden University started with undergraduate and graduate studies in mathematics, Hamiltonian mechanics, physics, and astronomy, after which he gained his MSc degree in 1955. After completing his master's degree, he served almost two years in the military. In 1958, he started his doctoral research in galactic astronomy, supervised by Jan H. Oort and Hendrik C. van de Hulst of the Astronomical Department at Leiden. His research topic was the three-dimensional orbital motions of stars in the galaxy. Characterizing orbital stellar motion in a galaxy could not be done analytically, so a number of sample orbits had to be computed using the rudimentary computers of the time. In cooperation with astronomer Ingrid Torgård (1918–2001) of Lund Observatory in Sweden, the then famous and extremely fast electronic computer BESK in Stockholm was programmed to do the necessary computing. The analysis of the problem, together with the computational results and Ollongren's interpretation of them, earned him a PhD degree in astronomy from Leiden University in 1962.

== Career ==
=== Leiden University ===
In 1961, the Leiden University Council decided that the university was in need of an institute to operate and manage a fast electronic computer in order to meet computing demands from a wide range of institutions. Thus, the Central Computing Institute was created. A modern, transistorized computer, the X1, built by the Dutch company Electrologica, was installed and Ollongren was appointed Acting Director of the Institute. A year later he became Associate Director of the university computer centre. As demands for computing services were increasing in the university, it became evident that the central computing institute would need more powerful computer facilities. After the appointment of Guus Zoutendijk, mathematician, as General Director in 1964, switching to an IBM mainframe was seriously considered and eventually effected. In the wake of the new orientation, Ollongren was granted a leave of absence.

=== Yale University ===
After being invited by Dirk Brouwer, for approximately a year and a half, between 1965 and 1967, Ollongren was a postdoctoral visiting research member in celestial mechanics and lecturer in mathematics at the well-known Research Center of Celestial Mechanics at Yale University, New Haven, Connecticut. While in the United States, he became well acquainted with the programming and use of modern, large-size IBM computing equipment. He then returned to the newly created Department of Applied Mathematics at Leiden University, and in 1968, became a lecturer in numerical mathematics and computer science. A year later, he became an Associate Professor in theoretical computer science, covering aspects of programming languages. In 1971, he was granted another leave of absence, enabling him to accept the position of Visiting Research Member at the IBM Research Laboratory in Vienna, Austria for three months.

=== Return to Leiden University ===
In 1980, Ollongren became a Full Professor of computer science at Leiden, specializing in the semantics of programming languages. That same year, he spent a half year sabbatical at the Department of Computer Science and Artificial Intelligence of Linköping University in Sweden. Several years later, the computer science section of the department became the Leiden Institute of Advanced Computer Science (LIACS).

Ollongren retired at the age of 65. He became Emeritus Professor of Leiden University in November 1993, delivering the public lecture called Vix Famulis Audenda Parat, including an invited speech by ‘Alan Turing’, which was enacted by George K. Miley, a university astronomer, in the University’s auditorium.

Ollongren was a member of several societies of computer science; astronomy, including the International Astronomical Union; and astronautics.

== SETI ==
After his retirement, he became interested in the academic debate on the Search for ExtraTerrestrial Intelligence (SETI), within the International Astronautical Academy. In particular, he wrote several studies in the field of interstellar communication with extraterrestrials. He also developed a new version of Lincos, a universally comprehensible language based on logic for the purpose of communication with extraterrestrial intelligence. His major contribution to this field was his book, Astrolinguistics, that was published by Springer in 2013.

== Personal life ==
He married Gunvor Ulla Marie Lundgren, a Swede, in 1965 in Jönköping. Their children are Karin Hildur (Kajsa) Ollongren, a noted liberal politician and government minister, born in 1967, and Peter Gunnar Ollongren, born in 1970.

Ollongren died in Oegstgeest on 25 March 2025, at the age of 96.
