= Richard Alan Wentworth =

American mathematician

Richard Alan Wentworth is an American mathematician based at the University of Maryland.

Wentworth received his Ph.D. from Columbia University in 1990, where he was supervised by Duong Hong Phong. He took his BS from the University of Wisconsin in 1985.

In 2012, Wentworth became a Fellow of the American Mathematical Society. He has served as Editor-in-Chief of Geometriae Dedicata since January 2023.
