= Kajsa Ollongren =

Dutch-Swedish politician (born 1967)

Jonkvrouw Kajsa Ollongren
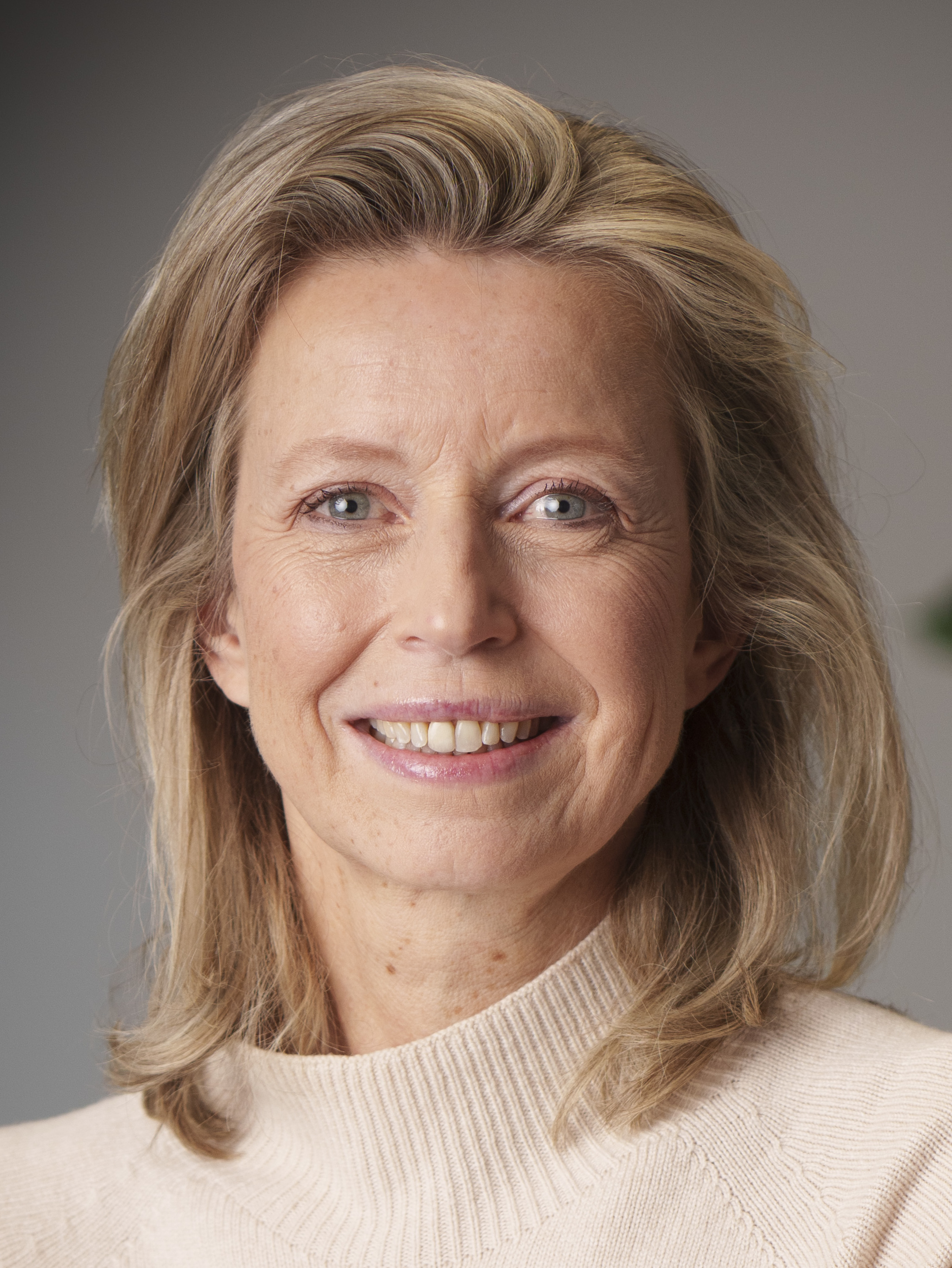
- Ollongren in 2022

Secretary-General of the European External Action Service
- Incumbent
- Assumed office 1 September 2026
- Preceded by: Belén Martínez Carbonell

Minister of Defence
- In office 10 January 2022 – 2 July 2024
- Prime Minister: Mark Rutte
- Preceded by: Henk Kamp
- Succeeded by: Ruben Brekelmans

Deputy Prime Minister of the Netherlands
- In office 14 May 2020 – 10 January 2022 Serving with Hugo de Jonge, Carola Schouten
- Prime Minister: Mark Rutte
- Preceded by: Wouter Koolmees
- Succeeded by: Wopke Hoekstra
- In office 26 October 2017 – 1 November 2019 Serving with Hugo de Jonge, Carola Schouten
- Prime Minister: Mark Rutte
- Preceded by: Lodewijk Asscher
- Succeeded by: Wouter Koolmees

Minister of the Interior and Kingdom Relations
- In office 14 April 2020 – 10 January 2022
- Prime Minister: Mark Rutte
- Preceded by: Raymond Knops (acting)
- Succeeded by: Hanke Bruins Slot
- In office 26 October 2017 – 1 November 2019
- Prime Minister: Mark Rutte
- Preceded by: Ronald Plasterk
- Succeeded by: Raymond Knops (acting)

Mayor of Amsterdam
- Acting
- In office 5 October 2017 – 26 October 2017
- Preceded by: Eberhard van der Laan
- Succeeded by: Eric van der Burg (acting)

Personal details
- Born: Karin Hildur Ollongren; 28 May 1967 (age 59) Leiden, Netherlands
- Citizenship: Netherlands; Sweden
- Party: Democrats 66
- Spouse: Irene van den Brekel (m. 2004)
- Children: 2
- Relatives: Alexander Ollongren (father)
- Education: University of Amsterdam (BA, MA); École nationale d'administration (BPA, MPA)

Jkvr. Karin Hildur "Kajsa" Ollongren (Dutch: [ˈkɑisaː ˈʔɔlɔŋgreːn]; Swedish: [ˈkâjsa ˈɔ̌lːɔnɡreːn]; born 28 May 1967) is a Dutch-Swedish politician and diplomat who currently serves as Secretary-General of the European External Action Service (EEAS). She previously served as Dutch Minister of Defence from 10 January 2022 to 2 July 2024. A member of the Democrats 66 (D66), she previously served as Minister of the Interior and Kingdom Relations and Deputy Prime Minister in the third Rutte cabinet (2017–2022), and briefly as Mayor of Amsterdam (October 2017). Since June 2025 she is EU Special Representative (EUSR) for human rights of the Council of the European Union.

== Early life and education ==
Ollongren was born on 28 May 1967 in Leiden to Jhr. Alexander Ollongren, a Dutch East Indies-born astronomer and computer scientist, and his Swedish wife Gunvor Lundgren. The Dutch Ollongren, originating from the Russian branch of the Finnish-Swedish noble family (originally named Ållongren), was incorporated into the untitled Dutch nobility in 2002, thereby giving her the noble predicate "jonkvrouw". Because of her Swedish mother, she also has Swedish citizenship.

Ollongren grew up in Oegstgeest, where she attended the secondary school Rijnlands Lyceum between 1979 and 1985. She then went to the University of Amsterdam, where she initially studied economics between 1985 and 1986, but switched her field of study in 1986 to history, in which she obtained an M.A. degree in 1991. She subsequently studied public administration at the École nationale d'administration in Paris and foreign relations at the Netherlands Institute of International Relations Clingendael.

== Career in the civil service ==
Ollongren started her career in the civil service at the Ministry of Economic Affairs, becoming a policymaker in the area of Central and Eastern Europe there in 1992, in which capacity she trained young political parties of the newly established democracies in the area. She was head of parliamentary affairs within the ministry until 2001, and director of European Integration and Strategy from 2001 to 2004, and became Deputy Director General of the ministry in 2004.

In 2007, Ollongren moved to the Ministry of General Affairs, the department headed by the Prime Minister, becoming Deputy Secretary General. She became Secretary General of the ministry in 2011.

== Political career ==
=== Local politics ===
After the 2014 local election, in which the Democrats 66 became the largest party of Amsterdam and entered the city's government, Ollongren became an alderwoman and first deputy mayor in Amsterdam, taking office on 18 June 2014. Her portfolio as alderwoman was extensive, including economic affairs, seaport, airport, participation, art, culture, local media, monuments and the city centre.

On 18 September 2017, the city's mayor Eberhard van der Laan announced in an open letter to the people of Amsterdam that he would step back from his public responsibilities due to ill health, leaving Ollongren to exercise these responsibilities in his stead from 19 September onward. The day after his death, on 6 October, Ollongren became acting Mayor of Amsterdam.

=== Minister of the Interior, 2017–2022 ===
On 26 October 2017, Ollongren was appointed as Minister of the Interior and Kingdom Relations in Prime Minister Mark Rutte's third cabinet, succeeding Ronald Plasterk. She also became the second of the cabinet's three Deputy Prime Ministers, serving alongside Hugo de Jonge and Carola Schouten. From 1 November 2019 to 14 April 2020, she was on medical leave of absence.

Following the 2021 general election, Ollongren (D66) and Annemarie Jorritsma of the People's Party for Freedom and Democracy (VVD) led the initial exploratory talks of the government formation. Both of them stepped down on 25 March 2021 after Ollongren was photographed carrying notes with confidential information visible. The talks had been suspended earlier that day, because Ollongren had tested positive for COVID-19.

=== Minister of Defence, 2022–2024 ===
Early in her tenure, Ollongren agreed to a Ukrainian request to supply 200 FIM-92 Stinger air defence rockets and 50 Panzerfaust 3 anti-tank systems with 400 rockets in response to the 2022 Russian invasion of Ukraine. Also during her time in office, the government earmarked an additional 2 billion euros ($2.2 billion) in military aid for Ukraine in 2024.

In June 2024, Ollongren said that the Netherlands would not object if Ukraine used Dutch-supplied F-16 fighters to strike targets inside Russia. The Schoof cabinet was sworn in on 2 July 2024, bringing an end to her term. Ollongren had introduced a bill days before that would require Dutch defence companies to produce for the Royal Netherlands Army in case of a potential war. The new cabinet would have to continue with the bill.

== EU Special representative ==
On June 23, 2025 Ollongren was appointed EU Special Representative (EUSR) for human rights. The European Union Special Representative (EUSR) for Human Rights is responsible for contributing to the implementation of the EU’s external human rights policy. This includes supporting the EU’s positions on compliance with international humanitarian law and engagement with international criminal justice mechanisms.

== Secretary General of the External Action Service ==
On June 24, 2026, Ollongren was appointed secretary general of the External Action Service, the EU's foreign policy wing, replacing Belén Martínez Carbonell.

== Personal life ==
Ollongren is married to television producer Irene van den Brekel. The couple has two children.

== Honours ==
- Sweden:
  - Commander Grand Cross (KmstkNO) of the Royal Order of the Polar Star
- Ukraine:
  - Order of Prince Yaroslav the Wise, III class

== Electoral history ==
Electoral history of Kajsa Ollongren
Year	Body	Party	Pos.	Votes	Result		Ref.
Year	Body	Party	Pos.	Votes	Party seats	Individual	Ref.
2006	House of Representatives	Democrats 66	5	3,174	3	Lost	
2021	House of Representatives	Democrats 66	80 (Note: Ollongren participated as a lijstduwer.)	3,123	24	Lost	
2023	House of Representatives	Democrats 66	75	727	9	Lost	
2024	European Parliament	Democrats 66	34	9,853	3	Lost	
2025	House of Representatives	Democrats 66	48	2,163	26	Lost	
2026	Amsterdam Municipal Council	Democrats 66	49	331	8	Lost	
2026	Amsterdam-Centrum District Committee	Democrats 66	13	379	2	Lost	

== Notes ==
Civic offices
Preceded by Richard van Zwol	Secretary-General of the Ministry of General Affairs; 2011–2014	Succeeded by Paul Huijts
Political offices
Preceded by Eberhard van der Laan	Mayor of Amsterdam (a.i.); 2017–2017	Succeeded by Eric van der Burg (a.i.)
Preceded by Lodewijk Asscher	Deputy Prime Minister; 2017–2022; Served alongside: Hugo de Jonge, Carola Schouten	Succeeded by Sigrid Kaag; Wopke Hoekstra; Carola Schouten
Preceded by Ronald Plasterk	Minister of the Interior and Kingdom Relations; 2017–2022	Succeeded by Hanke Bruins Slot
Preceded by Henk Kamp	Minister of Defence; 2022–2024	Succeeded by Ruben Brekelmans
