= Duong Hong Phong =

Vietnamese-American mathematician

- Born: Dương Hồng Phong; 30 August 1953 (age 73); Nam Dinh, Vietnam
- Education: École Polytechnique Fédérale de Lausanne; Princeton University
- Scientific career
- Fields: Mathematics
- Workplaces: Columbia University
- Doctoral students: Paul M. Feehan; Richard Wentworth

Duong Hong Phong (Vietnamese: Dương Hồng Phong, born 30 August 1953) is an American mathematician of Vietnamese origin. He is a professor of mathematics at Columbia University. He is known for his research on complex analysis, partial differential equations, string theory and complex geometry.

== Education and career ==
After graduating from Lycée Jean-Jacques Rousseau in Saigon, Phong attended a university year at the École Polytechnique Fédérale, Lausanne, Switzerland and then went to the United States as an undergraduate and then a graduate student at Princeton University. From 1975 to 1977, he was an L. E. Dickson instructor at the University of Chicago.

In 1977, he defended his dissertation entitled "On Hölder and L_{p} Estimates for the Conjugate Partial Equation on Strongly Pseudo-Convex Domains" under the direction of Elias Stein.

For the academic year 1977–1978, Phong was a researcher at the Institute for Advanced Study in Princeton, New Jersey. Since 1978, he has been at Columbia University. He served as the chair of the Columbia math department from 1995 to 1998.

== Recognition ==
In 1977-1878, he received an American Mathematical Society Fellowship.

In 1982-1984, he received an Alfred P. Sloan Fellowship.

In 1994, he was an Invited Speaker at the ICM in Zürich. He was the second Vietnamese to receive the honor (after Frédéric Pham).

In 2009 Phong was awarded the Stefan Bergman Prize for his research on the operators involved in the Neumann d-bar problem and on pseudo-differential operators.

In 2013, he was elected to the American Academy of Arts and Sciences.

He was named to the 2021 class of fellows of the American Mathematical Society "for contributions to analysis, geometry, and mathematical physics".

In 2024, he was elected to the National Academy of Sciences.

In 2025, he was named the Charles Davies Professor of Mathematics at Columbia. Previous holders of the chair include Lipman Bers, Masatake Kuranishi, and Richard S. Hamilton.

== Selected publications ==
- Fefferman C, Phong DH (1978). "On positivity of pseudo-differential operators". Proc Natl Acad Sci U S A. 75 (10): 4673–4. doi:10.1073/pnas.75.10.4673. PMC 336181. PMID 16592576.
- Phong DH (1979). "On integral representations for the Neumann operator". Proc Natl Acad Sci U S A. 76 (4): 1554–8. doi:10.1073/pnas.76.4.1554. PMC 383427. PMID 16592638.
- Fefferman C, Phong DH (1979). "On the lowest eigenvalue of a pseudo-differential operator". Proc Natl Acad Sci U S A. 76 (12): 6055–6. doi:10.1073/pnas.76.12.6055. PMC 411799. PMID 16592730.
- Fefferman C, Phong DH (1980). "On the asymptotic eigenvalue distribution of a pseudo-differential operator". Proc Natl Acad Sci U S A. 77 (10): 5622–5. doi:10.1073/pnas.77.10.5622. PMC 350120. PMID 16592889.
- Fefferman C, Phong DH (1982). "Symplectic geometry and positivity of pseudo-differential operators". Proc Natl Acad Sci U S A. 79 (2): 710–3. doi:10.1073/pnas.79.2.710. PMC 345817. PMID 16593153.
- Phong DH, Stein EM (1983). "Singular integrals related to the Radon transform and boundary value problems". Proc Natl Acad Sci U S A. 80 (24): 7697–701. doi:10.1073/pnas.80.24.7697. PMC 534412. PMID 16593402.
- Phong D. H., Stein E. M. (1986). "Hilbert integrals, singular integrals, and Radon transforms I". Acta Mathematica. 157: 99–157. doi:10.1007/BF02392592.
- D'Hoker Eric (1988). "The geometry of string perturbation theory". Reviews of Modern Physics. 60 (4): 917. doi:10.1103/RevModPhys.60.917.
- Phong D. H., Stein E. M. (1997). "The Newton polyhedron and oscillatory integral operators". Acta Mathematica. 179: 105–152. doi:10.1007/BF02392721.
- Phong D. H., Sturm J. "Lectures on stability and constant scalar curvature". Current Developments in Mathematics. 2009: 101–176. arXiv:0801.4179.
- Phong D. H., Sturm Jacob (2010). "Regularity of geodesic rays and Monge-Ampère equations". Proceedings of the American Mathematical Society. 138 (10): 3637. doi:10.1090/S0002-9939-10-10371-2.
- Guan Pengfei, Phong D. H. (2012). "Partial Legendre transforms of non-linear equations". Proceedings of the American Mathematical Society. 140 (11): 3831–3842. arXiv:1010.2111. doi:10.1090/S0002-9939-2012-11210-9.
