= Frederick Koon-Shing Leung =

Chinese mathematics professor

Frederick Koon-Shing Leung is the Emeritus Professor and Kintoy Professor in Mathematics Education at the Faculty of Education of the University of Hong Kong. He is the President of the International Commission on Mathematical Instruction (ICMI).

== Personal life ==
Leung was born and raised in Hong Kong. He studied in St. Stephen's College Preparatory School and then St. Paul's Co-educational College in Hong Kong. He became a mathematics teacher after graduating from the University of Hong Kong before joining the university again as a faculty member. He is married to Shirley Chiu Wing Wong, and they have two sons, King Ho Leung and See Ho Leung.

== Career ==
Leung earned his PhD from the University of London Institute of Education.

Leung was awarded the Hans Freudenthal medal by the International Commission for Mathematical Instruction in 2013, and was conferred the Bronze Bauhinia Star (BBS) by the Government of the Hong Kong Special Administrative Region in 2017. He was appointed a Senior Fulbright Scholar in 2003, a Changjiang Scholar by the Ministry of Education of China in 2014, and he received the World Outstanding Chinese award by the World Chinese Business Investment Foundation in 2015.

Leung was a Member at Large of the Executive Committee of International Commission on Mathematical Instruction (ICMI) from 2003 to 2009 and is the President of ICMI from 2021 to 2024. He was a member of the Standing Committee of International Association for the Evaluation of Academic Achievement (IEA) from 2007 to 2010, then an Honorary member of the International Association for the Evaluation of Educational Achievement (IEA). in 2019. At the University of Hong Kong, he was recognized as a Distinguished Alumnus of the Faculty of Science in 2019.

== Research Interest ==
Leung's research area is in comparative studies in mathematics education, including student achievement and classroom practices, with a specific focus on the influence of culture on different aspects of mathematics education. He has adopted the perspective of Confucian Heritage Culture (CHC) to explain the superior mathematics achievement of East Asian students in international studies such as the IEA Trends in International Mathematics and Science Studies (TIMSS) and the OECD Programme for International Student Assessment (PISA). Other research interests include the influence of culture (in particular the East Asian culture) on mathematics teaching and learning, mathematics education of children of ethnic minorities in China, and the influence of language on the learning of mathematics.
