= Paul M. Feehan =

Paul Matthew Niall Feehan (born 1961) studied electrical engineering at University College Dublin (BE 1982) and the University of Missouri at Rolla (ME 1984), before switching to mathematics. His 1992 Ph.D. on "Geometry of the Moduli Space of Self-Dual Connections on the Four-Sphere" was done at Columbia University under Duong Hong Phong.

He worked for several years at UC Berkeley, Harvard, and Ohio State University, and in 2000 was appointed Erasmus Smith's Professor of Mathematics at Trinity College Dublin. However, a year later he accepted a position at Rutgers, where he now does research in non-linear elliptic and parabolic partial differential equations, differential geometry, mathematical physics, and the applications of partial-integral differential equations to derivative security pricing and risk management. He is also the Director of the Mathematical Finance Master's Degree Program at Rutgers. In 2019 he became a Fellow of the American Mathematical Society.
