= Ollongren family =

Ollongren Ållongren
- Noble family
- Family coat of arms
- Country: Finland, Netherlands and Sweden
- Members: Kajsa Ollongren

The Ollongren family, also spelled Ållongren is a Swedish noble family.

== History ==
The progenitor of the family, Olof, owned an estate of Pepot (Peippola) in Porvoon maalaiskunta. His son Nils Olofsson was a Nimismies 1480.

The family was immatriculated into Swedish House of Nobility 1625 under number 115, and it got surname Ållongren i Finland from its coat of arms, displaying two oak tree branches with acorns (modern swedish: ekollon).

The family became extinct in Sweden 1806, but continued in Russia. The surname has been made known in Netherlands by astronomer Alexander Ollongren and politician Kajsa Ollongren.
