= Geometriae Dedicata =

- Discipline: Mathematics
- Language: English
- Edited by: Richard Alan Wentworth

Publication details
- Publisher: Springer Science+Business Media

Standard abbreviations
- ISO 4: Geom. Dedicata
- MathSciNet: Geom. Dedicata

Indexing
- ISSN: 0046-5755 (print); 1572-9168 (web)

Links
- Journal homepage

Geometriae Dedicata is a mathematical journal, founded in 1972, concentrating on geometry and its relationship to topology, group theory and the theory of dynamical systems. It was created on the initiative of Hans Freudenthal in Utrecht, the Netherlands. It is published by Springer Netherlands. The Editor-in-Chief is Richard Alan Wentworth.
