= Freudenthal Institute =

Coordinates: 52.087250°N 5.165563°E

The Freudenthal Institute (FI) is a research institute, part of the Faculty of Science of Utrecht University in the Netherlands. The FI aims to improve education in science and mathematics by means of education research and valorisation.

The institute was founded in 1971 by the German/Dutch writer, pedagogue and mathematician, professor Hans Freudenthal (1905–1990), as the Institute for the Development of Mathematical Education. In 1991, the institute was renamed after its founder.

Since 2003, an international institute for mathematics education, Freudenthal Institute - USA (Fi-US) was established in collaboration with the Wisconsin University in Madison, Wisconsin, USA. Since January 2006 Fi-US has been reallocated to the University of Colorado at Boulder.
