= Yvan Dutil =

Canadian astrophysicist

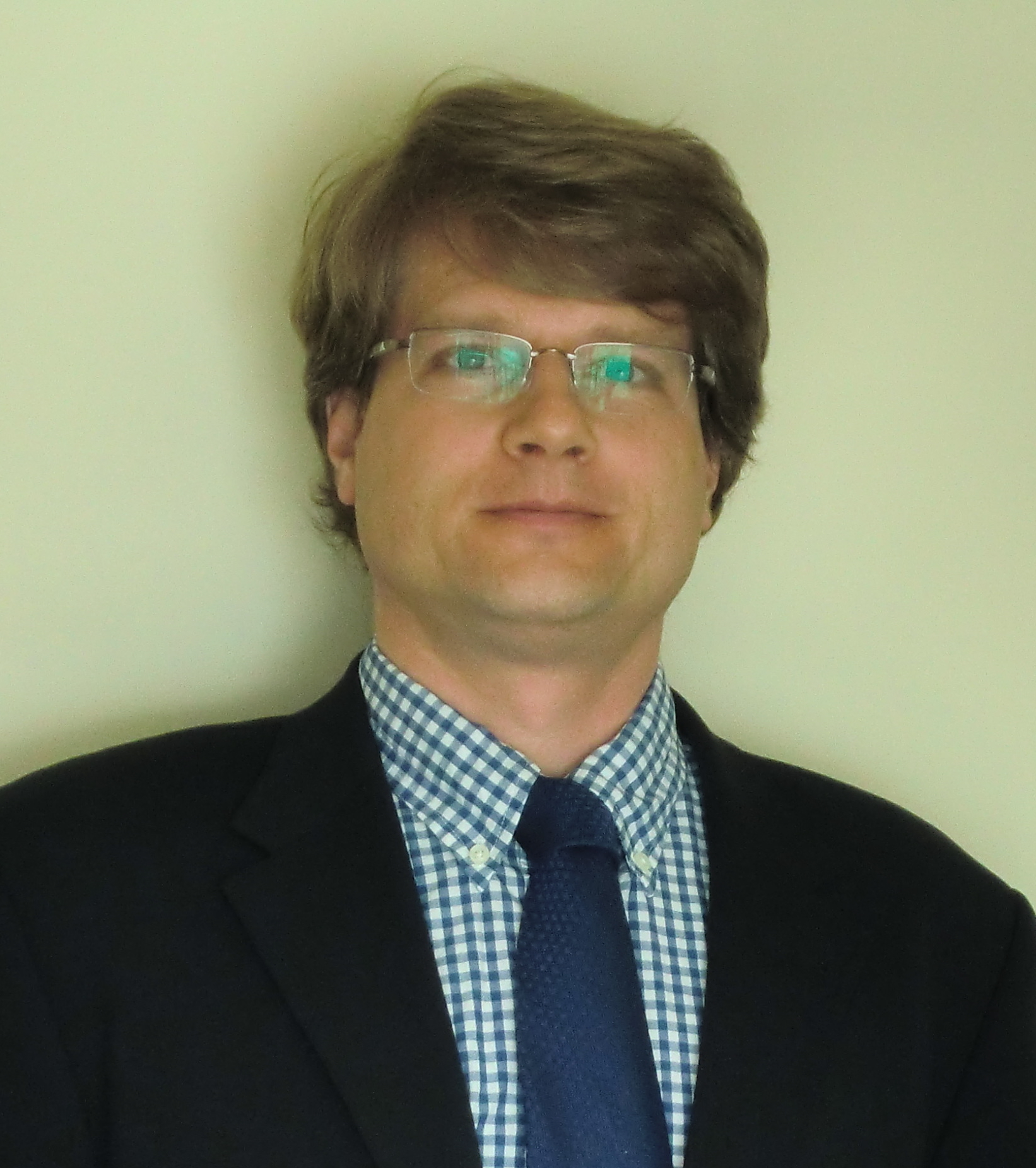
Yvan Dutil in 2011

Yvan Dutil, born April 6, 1970, is a Canadian astrophysicist. He is a member of the Bioastronomy Commission of the International Astronomical Union and of the International Academy of Astronautics's Permanent Committee on the Search for Extra-Terrestrial Intelligence (SETI). He and colleague Stéphane Dumas, created a noise-resistant coding system for messages aimed at communicating with extraterrestrial civilization. This system was used in the creation of messages beamed towards close stars from the Yevpatoria RT-70 radio telescope in Ukraine in 1999 and 2003.

Dutil was a candidate for the Green Party of Quebec in the Quebec election of September 2008, and for the Green Party of Canada in the Canadian federal election of 2011. He is active in fighting light pollution in Québec and advocates for the creation of a Dark Sky preserve around Mont Mégantic Observatory.

His areas of interest include astronomy, voting system reform, light pollution, and sustainable development.

== Bibliography ==
SETI

- (in English) Lincos with Dr. Yvan Dutil
- (in English) Lexique du Cosmic Call
- (in English) Error Correction Scheme in Active Seti
- (in English) Social Choice and Equity Theories: Seeking to Common Good as a Common Ground

Light Pollution

- (in French) Qui a volé les étoiles ?
- (in French) Éclairage Nocturne et Pollution Lumineuse, Mémoire Ville de Québec
- (in French) Plan de protection du ciel noir, Document d’information produit pour la conférence régionale des élus de Chaudière-Appalaches

Voting System Reform

- (in French) Pour une meilleure démocracie: Notion d'ingénierie électorale

Others

- (in French) Une crise énergétique annoncée, Les Choix et le Défi du Québec à l'horizon 2025
- (in French) L’astronomie Québécoise d'hier à aujourd’hui
