= Poetica Vaginal =

1986 artist project and interstellar signal

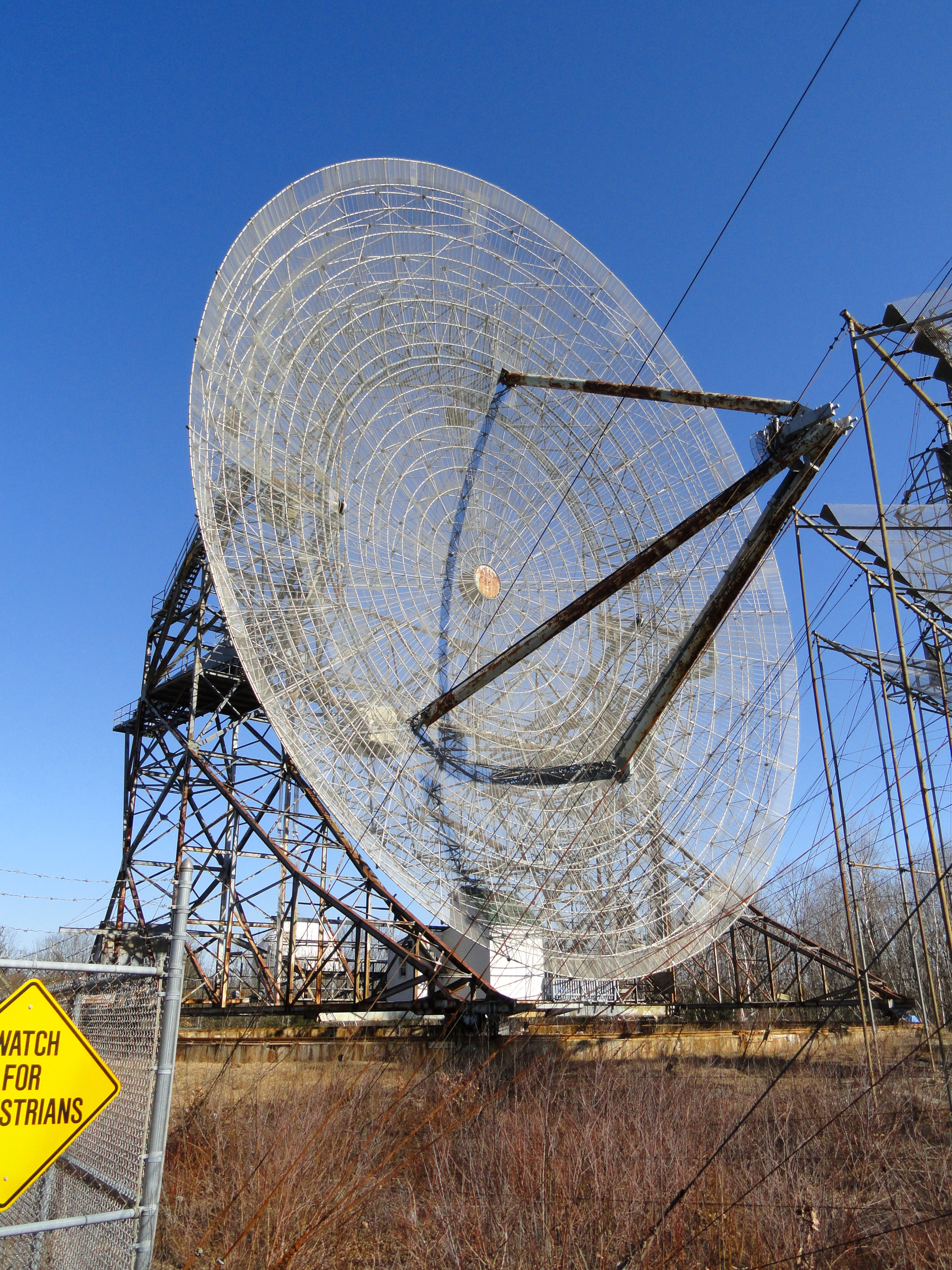
Millstone Hill Radar, the radiotelescope from where the signal was transmitted.

Poetica Vaginal was an art project by American scientist and bioartist Joe Davis and an interstellar signal briefly transmitted in 1986 from the MIT Millstone Radar, in Massachusetts. Davis converted vaginal contractions into an analog signal and digitally mapped the input into a phonetic audible representation (or voice). The project was able to send out a few test signals consisting of this data to the intended targets. However, the United States Air Force shut down the project before it sent out the bulk of the message.
