= Eric Burgess =

British astronomer and journalist (1920–2005)

Eric Burgess (1920 – March 2005) was an English freelance consultant, lecturer and journalist, who wrote about the Pioneer program of space missions since the first tests in 1957. He was the science correspondent of the Christian Science Monitor during many of the planetary probe launches, and was often the senior science reporter present at many of them.

Burgess is credited with the original idea that the Pioneer probes should carry a message for extraterrestrial intelligences. He approached Carl Sagan about his idea, which eventually resulted in the Pioneer plaque. Burgess was a fellow of the Royal Astronomical Society and British Interplanetary Society, and an associate fellow of the American Institute of Aeronautics and Astronautics.

Burgess and Arthur C. Clarke were both charter members of the British Interplanetary Society and lifelong friends. While Clarke claimed he invented the idea of using three satellites in geostationary orbit to create the global communication relay in common use (book dust jacket front fold-over sleeve of The Exploration of Space, A.C. Clarke, Harper Bros., 1951), Burgess claimed to have given the idea to Clarke in the late 1940s. Shortly before his death Burgess had a large collection of film and printed media on the subject of rocketry and space exploration that may have been donated by his heirs to a local library. Perhaps his greatest contribution other than the claim of having the idea for geosynchronous satellite communication networks (disputed with characteristic droll humor by Clarke) was his chronicling of the initial exploration of the Solar System (re: bibliography). He was also the science adviser for the 1979 James Bond film Moonraker which received an Academy Award nomination for its visuals which Burgess helped edit for accuracy.

== Bibliography ==
- Murray, Bruce; Burgess, Eric (1982). Flight to Mercury. Sybex Inc. ISBN 0-89588-087-3.
- Burgess, Eric (1957). Satellites and Space Flight. The Macmillan Company, New York.
- Burgess, Eric (1982). Celestial Basic: Astronomy on Your Computer. Sybex Inc. ISBN 0-89588-087-3.
- Burgess, Eric (1988). Uranus and Neptune: The Distant Giants. Columbia University Press. ISBN 0-231-06492-6.
- Burgess, Eric (1990). Return to the Red Planet. Columbia University Press. ISBN 0-231-06942-1.
- Burgess, Eric (1993). Outpost on Apollo's Moon. Columbia University Press. ISBN 0-231-07666-5.
- Burgess, Eric (1992). Far Encounter: The Neptune System. Columbia University Press. ISBN 0-231-07412-3.
- Fimmel, Richard O.; Colin, Lawrence; Burgess, Eric (1992). Pioneer Venus: A Planet Unveiled. NASA Ames Research Center. ISBN 0-9645537-0-8.
