= Vaginal contraction =

Contractions of the pelvic muscles surrounding the vagina

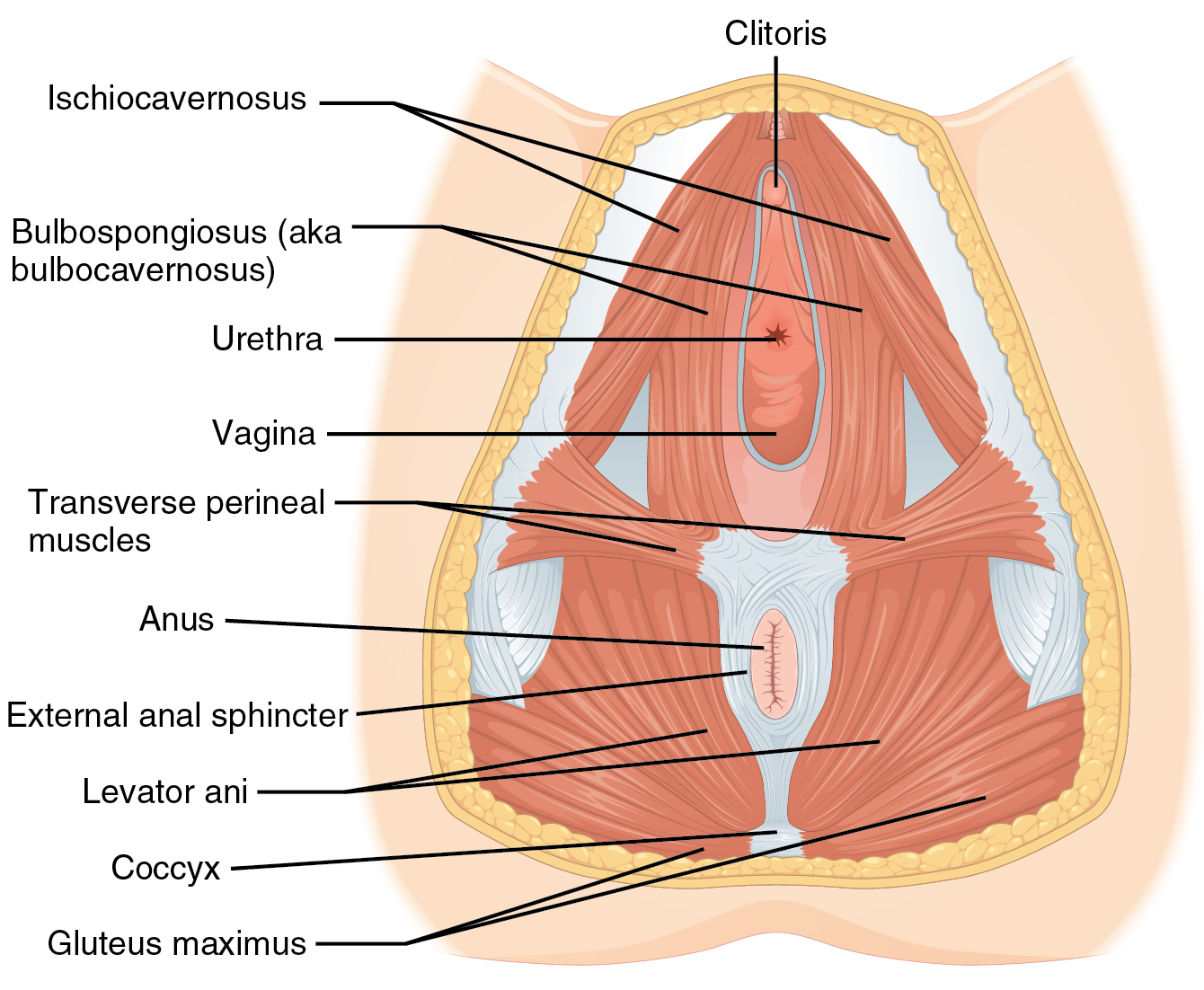

Vaginal contractions are contractions of the pelvic muscles surrounding the vagina, especially the pubococcygeus muscle. Vaginal contractions are generally an involuntary muscular response to orgasm. Women can control the muscles of the vagina to perform vaginal contractions at will. Vaginal contractions can enhance the sexual experience and pleasure for both parties during sexual intercourse.

In a 1982 study, pelvic contractions of 11 women who manually self-stimulated to orgasm were monitored using an anal probe and a vaginal probe simultaneously. Near the perceived start of orgasm, a series of regular contractions began in 9 of the women, with anal and vaginal contractions synchronizing with each other. Three of the women's orgasms consistently included only a series of regular contractions; for six other women, orgasms consistently continued beyond the regular series with additional irregular contractions. Two women had no regular contractions during reported orgasms. The women showed marked differences in orgasm duration and the number of contractions. A 1994 study confirmed these results but concluded that some women experience their orgasm regularly without contractions and some report having contractions during orgasm only occasionally.

Vaginal contractions are caused by both the activity of certain brain regions and the release of the hormone oxytocin. It has been suggested that vaginal contractions during orgasm can increase the chances of pregnancy as they transport sperm up the reproductive tract from the vagina to the oviducts, which decreases the distance it has to travel. Additionally, when the woman is fertile, sperm is only transported to the side of the dominant ovary.

Involuntary vaginal contractions may arise from non-sexual causes. Involuntary spasm of the muscles around the vagina, usually caused by anxiety, can result in vaginismus.

Vaginal contractions should not be confused with uterine contractions.

== See also ==
- Muscle tone
- Pelvic floor muscles
- Poetica Vaginal
