= Hans Freudenthal =

Jewish-German born Dutch mathematician

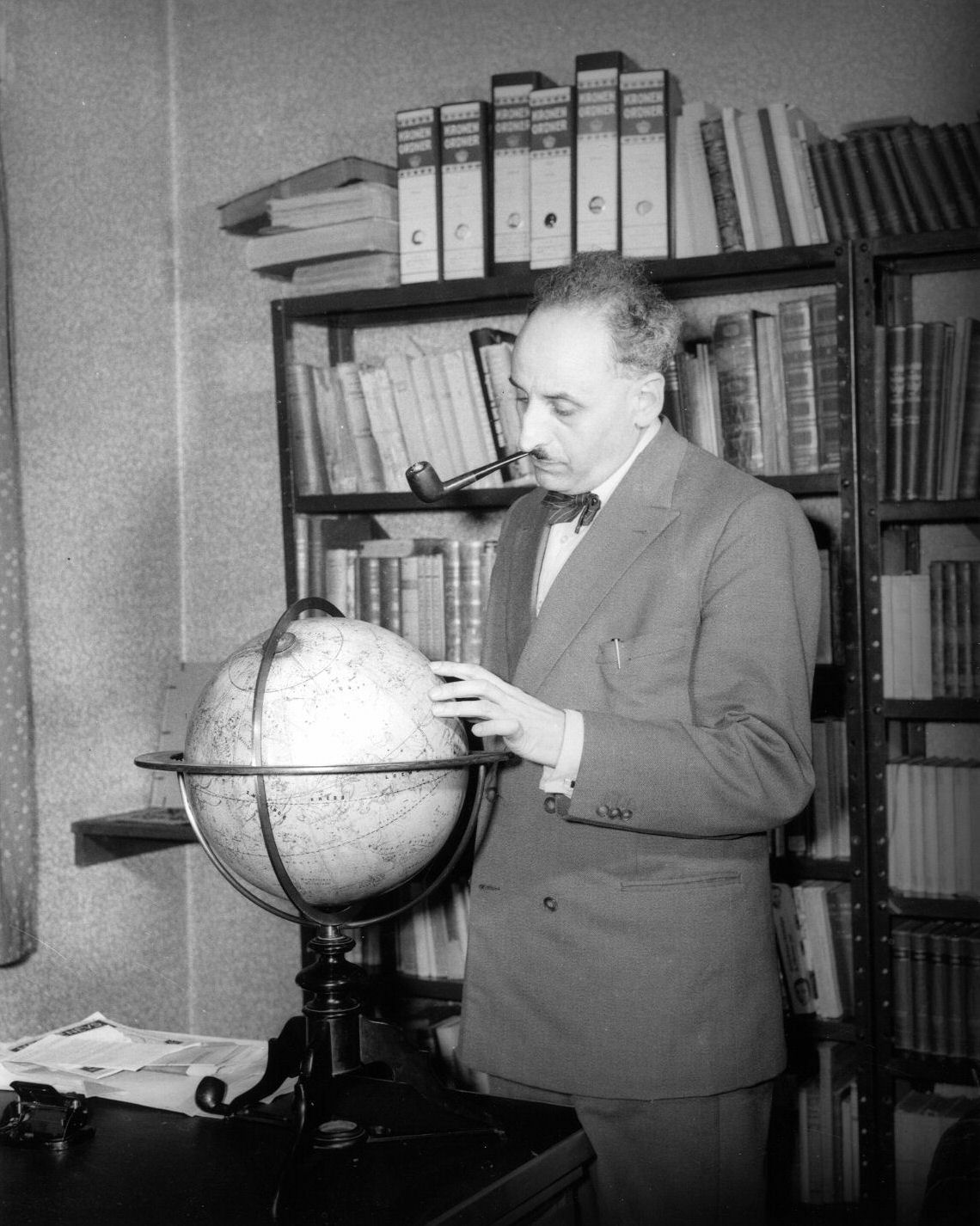
- Portrait of prof. dr. H. Freudenthal, 1957
- Born: 17 March 1905; Luckenwalde, Brandenburg
- Died: 13 October 1990 (aged 85); Utrecht, Netherlands
- Education: University of Berlin
- Known for: Freudenthal algebra Freudenthal magic square Freudenthal spectral theorem Freudenthal suspension theorem Freudenthal's diagonalization theorem Freudenthal's formula Freudenthal-Hopf theorems End (topology); Geometriae Dedicata; Lincos language Sum and Product Puzzle
- Awards: ICM Speaker (1936, 1954, 1983)
- Scientific career
- Fields: Mathematics
- Workplaces: University of Amsterdam
- Doctoral advisor: Heinz Hopf

Hans Freudenthal (17 September 1905 – 13 October 1990) was a Jewish German-born Dutch mathematician. He made substantial contributions to algebraic topology and also took an interest in literature, philosophy, history and mathematics education.

== Biography ==
Freudenthal was born in Luckenwalde, Brandenburg, on 17 September 1905, the son of a Jewish teacher. He was interested in both mathematics and literature as a child, and studied mathematics at the University of Berlin beginning in 1923. He met L. E. J. Brouwer in 1927, when Brouwer came to Berlin to give a lecture, and in the same year Freudenthal also visited the University of Paris. He completed his thesis work with Heinz Hopf at Berlin, defended a thesis on the ends of topological groups in 1930, and was officially awarded a degree in October 1931. After defending his thesis in 1930, he moved to Amsterdam to take up a position as assistant to Brouwer. In this pre-war period in Amsterdam, he was promoted to lecturer at the University of Amsterdam, and married his wife, Suus Lutter, a Dutch teacher.

Although he was a German Jew, Freudenthal's position in the Netherlands insulated him from the anti-Jewish laws that had been passed in Germany beginning with the Nazi rise to power in 1933. However, in 1940 the Germans invaded the Netherlands, following which Freudenthal was suspended from duties at the University of Amsterdam by the Nazis. In 1943 Freudenthal was sent to a labor camp in the village of Havelte in the Netherlands, but with the help of his wife (who, as a non-Jew, had not been deported) he escaped in 1944 and went into hiding with his family in occupied Amsterdam. During this period Freudenthal occupied his time in literary pursuits, including winning first prize under a false name in a novel-writing contest.

With the war over, Freudenthal's position at the University of Amsterdam was returned to him, but in 1946 he was given a chair in pure and applied mathematics and foundations of mathematics at Utrecht University, where he remained for the rest of his career. He served as the 8th president of the International Commission on Mathematical Instruction from 1967 to 1970. In 1971 he founded the Institute for the Development of Mathematical Education (IOWO) at Utrecht University, which after his death was renamed the Freudenthal Institute. In 1972 he founded and became editor-in-chief of the journal Geometriae Dedicata. He retired from his professorship in 1975 and from his journal editorship in 1981. He died in Utrecht in 1990, sitting on a bench in a park where he always took a morning walk.

== Contributions ==
In his thesis work, published as a journal article in 1931, Freudenthal introduced the concept of an end of a topological space. Ends are intended to capture the intuitive idea of a direction in which the space extends to infinity, but have a precise mathematical formulation in terms of covers of the space by nested sequences of compact sets. Ends remain of great importance in topological group theory, Freudenthal's motivating application, and also in other areas of mathematics such as the study of minimal surfaces.

In 1936, while working with Brouwer, Freudenthal proved the Freudenthal spectral theorem on the existence of uniform approximations by simple functions in Riesz spaces. In 1937 he proved the Freudenthal suspension theorem, showing that the suspension operation on topological spaces shifts by one their low-dimensional homotopy groups; this result was important in understanding the homotopy groups of spheres (since every sphere can be formed topologically as a suspension of a lower-dimensional sphere) and eventually formed the basis of stable homotopy theory. The Freudenthal magic square is a construction in Lie algebra developed by Freudenthal (and independently by Jacques Tits) in the 1950s and 1960s, associating each Lie algebra to a pair of division algebras.

In 1968, Freudenthal founded the journal, Educational Studies in Mathematics (ESM). Becoming one of the top-rated journals in the field of mathematics education, ESM was focused on publishing research around finding better ways to teach mathematics.

Later in his life, Freudenthal focused on elementary mathematics education. In the 1970s, his single-handed intervention prevented the Netherlands from following the worldwide trend of "new math". He was also a fervent critic of one of the first international school achievement studies. He interpreted mathematics as a human activity where students should open a scientific eye on the world around them, mathematizing real situations, in a context that makes sense for the students. This approach is called Realistic Mathematics Education (RME).

Freudenthal published the Impossible Puzzle, a mathematical puzzle that appears to lack sufficient information for a solution, in 1969. He also designed a constructed language, Lincos, to make possible communication with extraterrestrial intelligence.

== Selected publications ==
- Freudenthal, Hans (1931), "Über die Enden topologischer Räume und Gruppen", Mathematische Zeitschrift, 33: 692–713, doi:10.1007/BF01174375, S2CID 120965216, Zbl 0002.05603
- Freudenthal, Hans (1936), "Teilweise geordnete Moduln" (PDF), Proc. Akad. Wet. Amsterdam (in German), 39: 641–651, Zbl 0014.31302.
- Freudenthal, Hans (1937), "Über die Klassen der Sphärenabbildungen. I. Große Dimensionen", Compositio Mathematica (in German), 5: 299–314, Zbl 0018.17705.
- Freudenthal, Hans (1960), Lincos: design of a language for cosmic intercourse, Studies in logic and the foundations of mathematics, North-Holland Pub. Co..
- Freudenthal, Hans; de Vries, H. (1969), Linear Lie Groups, Pure and Applied Mathematics, vol. 35, New York: Academic Press, MR 0260926.
- Freudenthal, Hans (1972), Mathematics as an Educational Task, Springer, ISBN 9789027702357.
- Freudenthal, Hans (1986), Didactical Phenomenology of Mathematical Structures, Mathematics Education Library, vol. 1, Springer, ISBN 9789027722614.
- Freudenthal, Hans (1991), Revisiting Mathematics Education: China Lectures, Kluwer Academic Publishers, ISBN 0-7923-1299-6.
- Freudenthal, Hans; Freudenthal, Matías (2015), El viaje de Ofantito (in Spanish), Granada (Spain): Esdrújula Ediciones, ISBN 978-84-164850-9-3 [Children's story left unfinished in 1943, completed and translated into Spanish by his son Matijs (Matías)].

== Awards and honors ==
In 1951, Freudenthal became a member of the Royal Netherlands Academy of Arts and Sciences. He was also an honorary member of the International Academy of the History of Science. He was awarded the Gouden Ganzenveer award in 1984.

In 2000, the International Commission on Mathematical Instruction instituted an award named in honor of Freudenthal, the Hans Freudenthal Medal. It is given in odd-numbered years (beginning in 2003) for an "outstanding achievement in mathematics education research" in the form of "a major cumulative program of research". Recipients of the medal have included Celia Hoyles, Paul Cobb, Anna Sfard, Yves Chevallard, Luis Radford, Frederick Leung and Ole Skovsmose.

The asteroid 9689 Freudenthal is named after him.
