= Alien language =

Hypothetical language of extraterrestrial beings

Alien languages are a hypothetical subject since none have been encountered so far. The research in these hypothetical languages is variously called exolinguistics, xenolinguistics or astrolinguistics. A group of prominent linguists and animal communication scientists, including Noam Chomsky, have examined such hypothetical languages in the book Xenolinguistics: Towards a Science of Extraterrestrial Language, edited by astrobiologist Douglas Vakoch and linguist Jeffrey Punske. The question of what form alien languages might take and the possibility for humans to recognize and translate them has been part of the linguistics and language studies courses, e.g., at the Bowling Green State University (2001).

Starting with his hypothesis of a genetically predetermined universal grammar of human languages, Noam Chomsky held that it would be impossible for a human to naturally learn an alien language because it would most probably violate the universal grammar inborn in humans. Humans would have to study an alien language by the slow way of discovery, the same way as scientists conduct research in complex subjects.

Linguist Keren Rice posits that basic communication between humans and aliens should be possible, unless "the things that we think are common to languages—situating in time [and] space, talking about participants, etc.—are so radically different that the human language provides no starting point for it."

Jessica Coon, a professor of linguistics at McGill University, was consulted for the linguistic aspect of the 2016 film Arrival. While acknowledging that the graphical language in the film was art without linguistic meaning, she stated that the film was a fairly accurate portrayal of the approach human linguists would use in trying to understand an alien language.

Laurance Doyle and others have suggested an application of Zipf's law for detection of alien language in the search for extraterrestrial intelligence.

Solomon W. Golomb posited that in order to gain the ability to build radio transmitters or other devices capable of interstellar communication, or any other technology beyond the most rudimentary tools, knowledge must be accumulated over the course of many generations. Golomb further reasoned that since this requires that those who have learned knowledge from others can keep passing it on even after those who originally created the knowledge are dead, any beings capable of building civilizations must have an innate understanding that information retains its meaning no matter who utters it, and not block information out based on the generation of the messenger or deeming the same words acceptable or unacceptable depending on who utters them. It was held by Golomb that this ability, by being a necessary condition for accumulating information into culture in the first place, must be innate as something that is needed to form culture from the beginning cannot be an effect of culture. Golomb argued that this would create a common linguistic ground assisting humans with this ability in learning extraterrestrial languages. Ian Roberts, a professor of linguistics at the University of Cambridge says: "We are the only species that have language in the sense of an open-ended system which can be used to express anything you want to express". Roberts sits on the Advisory Council of Messaging Extraterrestrial Intelligence (METI), an organisation founded in 2015 to send messages from Earth to outer space in the hope of receiving a reply.

== See also ==
- Alien language in science fiction – How science fiction has used the science of language as a subject
- Animal language – Complex animal communication
- Astrolinguistics – Field of linguistics related to extraterrestrial life
- Communication with extraterrestrial intelligence – Branch of SETI
- Interspecies communication – Communication between different species
