= Brenda McCowan =

Animal behavior scientist

Brenda McCowan is a research behaviorist interested in evolutionary, biological, and ecological aspects of animal behavior and communication. Her work focuses on improving the health and welfare of domesticated production animals, captive species (zoo, laboratory), and wildlife using applied animal behavior and bioacoustics. She received her BS in Animal Physiology from Cornell University in 1985, and her PhD in Biological Anthropology from Harvard University in 1994. Dr. McCowan is the Program Head of Primate Behavioral Management at California National Primate Research Center, a position she has held since 2004. Dr. McCowan has been on the faculty at the University of California – Davis since 1999, and is currently an Associate Adjunct Professor in the Department of Population Health and Reproduction at the UC Davis School of Veterinary Medicine. She also heads the McCowan Lab of Behavioral Management at UC Davis School of Veterinary Medicine, and is affiliated with the SETI Institute, Hubbs-Sea World Institute, and Santa Fe Institute.

== Research Interests ==
=== Animal Welfare ===
==== Primate Behavioral Management ====
As Program Head of Primate Behavioral Management at California National Primate Research Center, McCowan has published numerous studies regarding the behavioral management of primates used for laboratory testing, predominantly rhesus macaques (Macaca mulatta). Many of these studies examine methods for reducing aggression and injury and improving well-being.

==== Poultry Welfare ====
It is a widespread practice in the poultry industry to induce molting in egg-laying chickens, which maximizes both egg production and hen health. However, the effects of induced molting on hen well-being are poorly understood. The most common method for inducing molting is via forced fasting (fast-induced), and there is growing concern that hen well-being is negatively affected by fast-induced molting. A less popular but promising method of induced molting involves feeding of low-caloric density feed (nonfasting-induced). McCowan et al. (2006) examined the behavior of chickens subjected to different induced molting styles and found that cage pecking, aggression, and gakel calling increased in fast-induced chickens. McCowan et al. (2006) concluded that nonfast-induced molting appears to be a more appropriate method, minimizing discomfort during a physiologically stressful time. The data also support gakel vocalization as an indicator of stress/discomfort in chickens, which are notoriously stoic and therefore have been hard to assess for well-being, historically.

==== Dairy Production ====
Cows, as with many mammals, use vocal communication to mediate and strengthen strong mother-infant bonds. Calves often call to their mothers in times of need (hunger, danger), and it is believed that certain calls are used to solicit nursing. McCowan et al. (2002) found that playback of calf vocalizations caused a statistically significant increase (1-2%) in milk production in dairy cows. The cows most responsive to the vocalizations were those cows whose actual infants were closest in age to the calves used for the recordings (less than 1 week old); therefore, it is possible that milk production within a dairy herd could be increased further if multiple playbacks of calf vocalizations were used, varying by age as appropriate for the cows (McCowan 2002). (Young calf playbacks to cows with young calves; older calf playbacks to cows with older calves, etc.) These results highlight an innovative non-chemical method for increasing milk production in dairy cows, and are especially important findings for use on organic dairy farms, as the demand for organic products grows.

=== Wildlife Conservation ===
==== Ground Squirrels ====
Belding's ground squirrels (Spermophilus beldingi) are social squirrels living in the western United States which exhibit kin altruism by making alarm calls commonly referred to as ‘chirps’ to warn other individuals of terrestrial or aerial predators. Belding's ground squirrels live in colonies of related females and their dependent offspring, with the older sons dispersing to find other less-related females’ burrows, and the daughters staying to expand upon their mother's current burrow system. McCowan et al. (2002) hypothesized that there is an acoustic variability in these chirps dependent on individual identity, sex, and social group membership which is subsequently important in kin and social group recognition. McCowan et al. (2002) recorded the alarm chirps of eight adult female Belding's ground squirrels from four lakes in the High Sierra Nevada mountain range, analyzed the acoustic structure of these chirps, and found the chirps to be individually distinctive, yet with similarity among individuals that may correspond to genetic similarity. McCowan et al. (2002) concluded that analysis of acoustic variation may then be a reliable, noninvasive tool for tracking dispersal patterns and other population dynamics in this species, as well as in other more threatened and endangered vocal mammalian species.

==== Humpback Whales ====
The effects of anthropogenic noise caused by ships, sonar, and other manmade systems on marine mammals have received increasing attention in recent years by environmental organizations, governmental agencies, and the general public. Such noise is potentially disrupting the feeding and mating behavior of marine mammals which rely on vocal communication and echolocation. After recording over 50 hours of vocalizations from 100 humpback whales (Megaptera novaeangliae) in Glacier Bay National Park over 5 years, McCowan et al. (2008) introduced a quantitative tool, based on information theory, that can characterize and quantify humpback whale responses to environmental boat noise. The researchers conclude that use of this new tool has the potential to help determine the effects of boat noise on humpback whale vocal communication and population dynamics, and may also be used to evaluate anthropogenic noise effects on other wildlife populations.

=== Behavioral Ecology of Infectious Disease ===
==== Domestic Livestock ====
Mastitis, a potentially fatal inflammatory infection of the mammary glands, is a common health problem in dairy cows in the United States and causes great economic losses for the dairy industry each year due to reduced milk production in cows with mastitis. While the influence of contagious gram-positive bacteria (e.g. Staphylococcus and Streptococcus) – which used to be the primary cause for mastitis in dairy cows – has been significantly reduced in recent years, environmental pathogens such as coliform bacteria (e.g. E. coli) and noncontagious Streptococcus now play a larger role in the infection of dairy cows. This is cause for concern as environmental bacteria, noncontagious Streptococcus especially, are becoming increasingly resistant to antimicrobial intramammary therapy. McCowan et al. (2005) set out to determine if certain housing facilities, husbandry practices, and/or use of antimicrobial agents caused higher levels of resistant environmental bacteria. The researchers sampled the bulk tank milk of nearly 100 California dairies and conducted a face-to-face on-site questionnaire for approximately 50 of the dairies found to have at least 3 environmental bacteria isolates. McCowan et al. (2005) analyzed the results and found that not drying udders before attaching the milk units significantly increased chances of antimicrobial resistance, as did the use of some antimicrobial agents (ceftiofur, Sulfadimethoxine) for treatment of non-mastitis diseases. Surprisingly, no antimicrobial agents used to treat mastitis were found to cause increased resistance.

=== Socio-Cognitive Complexity / Communication Complexity ===
==== Squirrel Monkeys ====
Squirrel monkeys (Saimiri sciureus) are highly social New World monkeys found in Central and South America which exhibit various alarm calls to warn other individuals of potential predators. McCowan et al. (2000) researched the role of learning in the development of chuck call recognition in squirrel monkeys, hypothesizing that monkeys at different developmental stages (ages) respond preferentially to the chuck calls of familiar – yet genetically unrelated – companions as compared to those of unfamiliar individuals. The researchers conducted a controlled playback experiment on four different age classes of squirrel monkeys and found that infants did not appear to have any preference for the chuck calls of close social associateds or other social group members, concluding that learning plays a role in chuck call recognition in squirrel monkeys and that infants gradually learn to acoustically recognize social companions within their group.

To warn others in highly threatening situations, squirrel monkeys use an alarm call known as an alarm peep. In a later study, McCowan et al. (2001) examined the role of learning in the development of response to alarm peeps. The researchers again conducted a controlled playback experiment on four different age classes of squirrel monkeys, and found that adult females were more discerning in their responses to alarm peeps, preferring to trust the peeps of other adult females as opposed to the peeps of infants or juveniles. The researchers concluded that squirrel monkeys do learn more appropriate responses to alarm peeps over their first year of development.

== Selected publications ==
- Rommeck I, Capitanio JP, Strand SC, and McCowan B. (2011). Early social experience affects behavioral and physiological responsiveness to stressful conditions in infant rhesus macaques (Macaca mulatta). American Journal of Primatology.
- Rommeck I, McCowan B, Anderson K, Heagerty A, and Cameron A. (2009). Risk factors and remediation of self-injurious and self-abuse behavior in rhesus macaques. Journal of Applied Animal Welfare Science 12:61-72.
- Stoddard RA, Atwill RA, Conrad PA, Byrne S, Jang S, Lawrence J, McCowan B, and Gulland FMD. (2009). The effect of rehabilitation of northern elephant seals (Mirounga angustirostris) on antimicrobial resistance of commensal Escherichia coli. Veterinary Microbiology 133:264-71.
- Doyle L, McCowan B, Hanser S, Bucci T, Chyba C, and Blue E. (2008). Applicability of information theory to the quantification of responses to anthropogenic noise by Southeast Alaskan humpback whales. Entropy 10:33-46.
- Marino L, Connor RC, Fordyce RE, Herman LM, Hof PR, Lefebvre L, Lusseau D, McCowan B, Nimchinsky EA, Pack AA, Reidenberg JS, Reiss D, Rendell L, Uhen MD, Van der Gucht E, Whitehead H. (2008). A claim in search of evidence: Reply to Manger's thermogenesis hypothesis of cetacean brain structure. Biological Reviews 83:417-40.
- Marino L, Connor RC, Fordyce RE, Herman LM, Hof PR, Lefebvre L, Lusseau D, McCowan B, Nimchinsky E, Pack AA, Rendell L, Reidenberg JS, Reiss D, Uhen MD, Van der Gucht E, Whitehead H. (2008). Cetaceans have complex brains for complex cognition. Public Library of Science 5:e139.
- McCowan B, Anderson K, Heagerty A, and Cameron A. (2008). The utility of social network analysis in primate behavioral management. Applied Animal Behaviour Science 109:396–405.
- Wyman MT, Mooring MS, McCowan B, Penedo MCT, and Hart LA. (2008). Amplitude of bison bellows reflects male quality, physical condition and motivation. Animal Behavior 76(5):1625–1639.
- Coss R, McCowan B, and Ramakrishnan U. (2007). Threat-related acoustical differences in alarm calls by wild bonnet macaques (Macaca radiata) elicited by python and leopard models. Ethology 113:352-367.
- Hooper SL, Reiss DR, Carter M, and McCowan B. (2006). Importance of contextual saliency on vocal imitation by bottlenose dolphins. International Journal of Comparative Psychology 19:116-128.
- Khan K, Markowitz H, and McCowan B. (2006). Vocal development in captive harbor seal pups, Phoca vitulina richardii: age, sex, and individual differences. Journal of the Acoustical Society of America 120:1684–1694.
- McCowan B. (2006). Are bubblestream whistles unrepresentative of a bottlenose dolphin's whistle repertoire? Marine Mammal Science 22:492–495.
- McCowan B, Cardona C, DiLorenzo AM, Jeffrey J, and Klingborg D. (2006). Effects of induced molting on the well-being of egg-laying chickens. Journal of Applied Animal Welfare Science 9:9-23.
- McCowan B and Rommeck I. (2006). Bioacoustic monitoring of aggression in group-housed rhesus macaques. Journal of Applied Animal Welfare Science 9:261–268.
- Kirk JH, McCowan B, Atwill ER, Glenn KS, Higginbotham GE, Collar CA, Catillo A, Reed BA, Peterson NP, Cullor J. (2005). Epidemiology and Antibiotic Resistance of "Environmental Streptococci" isolated from bulk tank milk collected on California dairies. Journal of Dairy Science 88:3710–3720. [PDF]
- McCowan B, Doyle LR, Jenkins J, and Hanser SF. (2005). The appropriate use of Zipf's law in animal communication studies. Animal Behaviour 69:F1-F7.
- Randall J, McCowan B, Collins K, Hooper SL, and Rogovin K. (2005). Alarm signals of the great gerbil: acoustic variation by predator context, sex, age, individual and family group. Journal of the Acoustical Society of America 118:1-9.
- Wood JD, McCowan B, Langbauer WR, Viljoen J, and Hart L. (2005). Classification of African elephant Loxodonta africana rumbles using acoustic parameters and cluster analysis. Bioacoustics 15:143-161.
- Yin S and McCowan B. (2004). Barking in domestic dogs: context specificity and individual identification. Animal Behaviour 68:343-355.
- Rabin L, McCowan B, Hooper S, and Owings D. (2003). Anthropogenic noise and its effect on animal communication: An interface between comparative psychology and conservation biology. International Journal of Comparative Psychology 16:172-192.
- McCowan B, DiLorenzo AM, Abichandani S, Borelli C, and Cullor JS. (2002). Bioacoustic tools for enhancing animal productivity and management: Effects of recorded calf vocalizations on milk production in dairy cows. Applied Animal Behaviour Science 77:13-20.
- McCowan B, Doyle LR, and Hanser SF. (2002). Using information theory to assess the diversity, complexity and development of communicative repertoires. Journal of Comparative Psychology 116:166-172.
- McCowan B and Hooper SL. (2002). Individual acoustic variation in Belding's ground squirrel alarm chirps in the High Sierra Nevada. Journal of the Acoustical Society of America 111:1157–1160.
- McCowan B, Franceschini NV, and Vicino GA. (2001). Age differences and developmental trends in alarm peep responses by squirrel monkeys (Saimiri sciureus). American Journal of Primatology 53(1):19-31.
- McCowan B and Reiss D. (2001). The fallacy of 'signature whistles' in bottlenose dolphins: a comparative perspective of ‘signature information’ in animal vocalizations. Animal Behaviour 62(6):1151–1162.
- McCowan B, Marino L, Vance E, Walke L, and Reiss D. (2000). Bubble ring play of bottlenose dolphins (Tursiops truncatus): implications for cognition. Journal of Comparative Psychology 114:98-106.
- McCowan B and Newman JD. (2000). The role of learning in chuck call recognition by squirrel monkeys (Saimiri sciureus). Behaviour 137:279-300.
- McCowan B, Hanser SF, and Doyle LR. (1999). Quantitative tools for comparing animal communication systems: information theory applied to bottlenose dolphin whistle repertoires. Animal Behaviour 57:409-419.
- McCowan B, Reiss D, and Gubbins CM. (1998). Social familiarity influences whistle acoustic structure in adult female bottlenose dolphins (Tursiops truncatus). Aquatic Mammals 24:21-40.
- Reiss D, McCowan B, and Marino L. (1997). Communicative and other cognitive characteristics of dolphins. Trends in Cognitive Sciences 1(4):140-145.
- McCowan B. (1995). A new quantitative technique for categorizing whistles using simulated signals and whistles from captive bottlenose dolphins (Delphindae Tursiops truncatus). Ethology 100:177- 193.
- McCowan B and Reiss D. (1995). Maternal aggressive contact vocalizations in captive bottlenose dolphins (Tursiops truncatus): wide-band, low frequency signals during mother/aunt-infant interactions. Zoo Biology 14(4):293-310.
- McCowan B and Reiss D. (1995). Quantitative comparison of whistle repertoires from captive adult bottlenose dolphins (Delphindae Tursiops truncatus): a re-evaluation of the signature whistle hypothesis. Ethology 100:193-209.
- McCowan B and Reiss D. (1995). Whistle contour development in captive-born infant bottlenose dolphins: role of learning. Journal of Comparative Psychology 109(3):242-260.
