= Stéphane Dumas (astrophysicist) =

Canadian physicist, astrobiologist and computer scientist (1970-2016)

Stéphane Dumas (1970–2016) was a Canadian physicist who, together with his colleague Yvan Dutil, has created a noise-resistant coding system for messages aimed at communicating with extraterrestrial civilization. This system was used in the creation of messages beamed towards close stars from the Yevpatoria RT-70 radio telescope in Ukraine in 1999 and 2003.

Stéphane Dumas completed bachelor's degree in physics at the Université Laval in 1992. He also completed a master's degree in physics at the same institution in 2009. The topic of is dissertation was the detection by diffuse reflectance in infrared of endolithic colony. The objective was to be able to detect life inside rock in a non-destructive way, since in Mars analogue environment, half of the biomass lay in its hidden form. His supervisors were Gilles Joncas and Yvan Dutil. This was the first master's degree in astrobiology at the Université Laval and one of the first in Québec.

In addition to his participation the Cosmic Call project, he was an active member of the IAA SETI Committee. He has been involved in many public debates on the risk related to active SETI, especially with David Brin. More recently, he has been carried some research on history of SETI. Also, he has worked with Claudio Maccone on the application of the Karhunen–Loève transform (KLT) for SETI observations. He also wrote Guest Editorials for The SETI League website and has long served as a SETI League volunteer Regional Coordinator. He was also the president of the Quebec Centre of the Royal Astronomical Society of Canada from 2006 to 2013.

For the most of his career, he has worked as a computer scientist at the RDDC Valcartier on weapons effect simulation.

He suddenly died in his home, on 9 June 2016, apparently as an indirect consequence of influenza.

== Bibliography ==
SETI

- Lincos with Dr. Yvan Dutil
- Lexique du Cosmic Call
- Error Correction Scheme in Active Seti
- Social Choice and Equity Theories: Seeking to Common Good as a Common Ground
