= 2114 Wallenquist =

Main-belt asteroid

Discovery
- Discovered by: C.-I. Lagerkvist
- Discovery site: Mount Stromlo Obs.
- Discovery date: 19 April 1976

Designations
- Named after: Åke Wallenquist (Swedish astronomer)
- Alternative designations: 1976 HA · 1930 DG; 1942 LD · 1953 GZ; 1964 FA · 1970 EO_{3} 1970 EZ_{2}
- Minor planet category: main-belt · Themis

Orbital characteristics
- Epoch 4 September 2017 (JD 2458000.5)
- Uncertainty parameter 0
- Observation arc: 63.51 yr (23,198 days)
- Aphelion: 3.6508 AU
- Perihelion: 2.7467 AU
- Semi-major axis: 3.1987 AU
- Eccentricity: 0.1413
- Orbital period (sidereal): 5.72 yr (2,090 days)
- Mean anomaly: 91.271°
- Mean motion: 0° 10^{m} 20.28^{s} / day
- Inclination: 0.5558°
- Longitude of ascending node: 1.5530°
- Argument of perihelion: 216.98°

Physical characteristics
- Dimensions: 21.12±1.26 km 22.558±0.079; 23.008±0.190 km 27.45 km (derived); 27.67±2.3 km (IRAS:2)
- Synodic rotation period: 5.49±0.01 h 5.5078±0.0009 h 5.510±0.005 h
- Geometric albedo: 0.0447 (derived); 0.0838±0.016 (IRAS:2); 0.1216±0.0099; 0.145±0.019; 0.149±0.020
- Spectral type: S
- Absolute magnitude (H): 11.1 · 11.749±0.002 (R) · 11.8 · 11.87±0.23

2114 Wallenquist, provisional designation 1976 HA, is a Themistian asteroid from the outer region of the asteroid belt, approximately 28 kilometers in diameter. It was discovered by Swedish astronomer Claes-Ingvar Lagerkvist at the Australian Mount Stromlo Observatory near Canberra, on 19 April 1976.

== Orbit and classification ==
Wallenquist is a member of the Themis family, a dynamical family of outer-belt asteroids with nearly coplanar ecliptical orbits. It orbits the Sun in the outer main-belt at a distance of 2.7–3.7 AU once every 5 years and 9 months (2,090 days). Its orbit has an eccentricity of 0.14 and an inclination of 1° with respect to the ecliptic. The first used observation was made at the U.S. Goethe Link Observatory in 1953, extending the asteroid's observation arc by 23 years prior to its discovery.

== Physical characteristics ==
=== Rotation period ===
In April 2010, a rotational lightcurve of Wallenquist obtained by American astronomer Robert Stephens at the Goat Mountain Astronomical Research Station (GMARS, G79), California, gave a well-defined rotation period of 5.510 hours with a brightness amplitude of 0.22 magnitude (U=3).

Two other observations, by French astronomer René Roy at Blauvac Observatory (627), France, and by astronomers at the U.S. Palomar Transient Factory, gave a period of 5.49±0.01 and 5.5078±0.0009, with an amplitude of 0.30 and 0.23, respectively (U=2/2).

=== Diameter and albedo ===
According to the surveys carried out by the Infrared Astronomical Satellite, IRAS, the Japanese Akari satellite, and the NEOWISE mission of NASA's Wide-field Infrared Survey Explorer, Wallenquist measures between 21.1 and 27.6 kilometers in diameter while its surface has an albedo in the range of 0.08 and 0.15.

The Collaborative Asteroid Lightcurve Link (CALL) derives an even lower albedo of 0.04 and calculates a diameter of 27.5 kilometer. Despite its low albedo, CALL characterizes the body as a S-type rather than a darker C-type asteroid.

== Naming ==
This minor planet was named in honor of Swedish astronomer Åke Wallenquist (1904–1994), former director of the Kvistaberg Station, after which the minor planet 3331 Kvistaberg is named.

After his retirement Wallenquist continued to research dark matter in open clusters at the Uppsala Astronomical Observatory. He co-discovered the near-Earth Amor asteroid 1980 Tezcatlipoca during his stay at the Palomar Observatory in California in 1950. The official naming citation was published by the Minor Planet Center on 1 February 1979 (M.P.C. 4645).
