= Alexander Zaitsev (astronomer) =

Russian astronomer (1945–2021)

Aleksandr Zaitsev
- Александр Зайцев
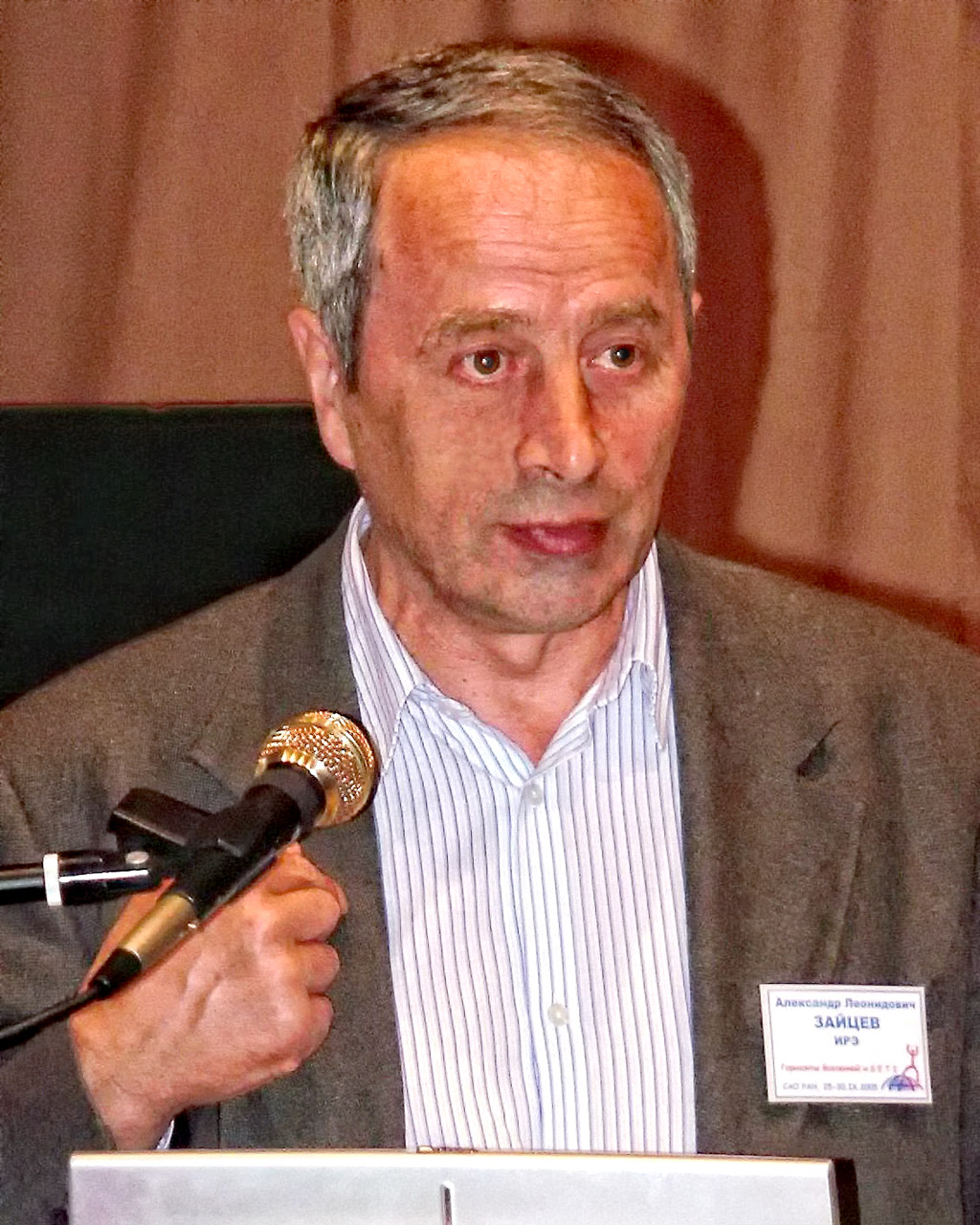
- Zaitsev in 2005
- Born: Aleksandr Leonidovich Zaitsev; 19 May 1945; Shchyolkovo, Russian SFSR, Soviet Union
- Died: 29 November 2021 (aged 76); Moscow, Russia
- Known for: the chief scientist at the Russian Academy of Science's Institute of Radio Engineering and Electronics the SETI League's Regional Coordinator for Russia
- Scientific career
- Fields: Radar astronomy Messaging to Extra-Terrestrial Intelligence (METI) near-Earth asteroid radar research

Aleksandr Leonidovich Zaitsev (Russian: Александр Леонидович Зайцев; 19 May 1945 – 29 November 2021) was a Russian and Soviet radio engineer and astronomer from Fryazino. He worked on radar astronomy devices, near-Earth asteroid radar research, and SETI.

== Education ==
Zaitsev received his M.Sc. degree in radio engineering from the Moscow Mining University in 1967 and his Ph.D. (1981) and his postdoctoral lecture qualification (1997) in radar astronomy from the Institute of Radio Engineering and Electronics, Russian Academy of Science in Moscow. He was a member of the Space Guard Foundation, the SETI League, and The European Radio Astronomy Club (E.R.A.C.).

== Career ==
Zaitsev was the chief scientist at the Russian Academy of Science's Institute of Radio Engineering and Electronics. He headed the group transmitting Team Encounter's interstellar messages using the Yevpatoria (Evpatoria) Deep Space Center (EDSC). Zaitsev was also serving as the SETI League's Regional Coordinator for Russia.

Zaitsev's career has focused on three main topics: the theory, the design and implementation of radar devices used in the study of Venus, Mars, and Mercury; near-Earth asteroid radar research; and interstellar radio messaging, his later field of research. He retired in 2013.

Zaitsev observed the asteroid 4179 Toutatis in December 1992 using the 70-m Yevpatorian Planetary Radar in Crimea (Ukraine), as a sounding signal transmitter, and the 100-m radio telescope in Effelsberg, Germany, as a receiver of the asteroid's radar echo.

In June 1995, Zaitsev was responsible for initiating the world's first intercontinental radar astronomy experiment; the radar groups participating in this experiment were led by Steven Ostro at JPL, Zaitsev in Yevpatoria, and Yasuhiro Koyama in Kashima, Japan. Ostro's group transmitted and received using the Goldstone site of the Deep Space Network, while Zaitsev received using the Yevpatoria site and Koyama's group received at Kashima. The target asteroid, 6489 Golevka, was later named for the participating observatories (GOL-EV-KA or GOLdstone-EVpatoria-KAshima). Zaitsev has also conducted work on using radar to determine the composition of asteroids and planetary bodies.

Zaitsev supervised the transmission of the 1999 and 2003 Cosmic Calls from Yevpatoria Planetary Radar (EPR). Under his leadership, a youth group in Moscow composed and broadcast a 'Teen Age Message to ETI'. Zaitsev proposed three-section structure of interstellar radio messages, coined the acronym METI (Messaging to Extra-Terrestrial Intelligence) and the phrase 'SETI paradox', which refers to an apparent "paradox" where two distant civilizations capable of interstellar communication will always remain silent unless one of them contacts the other first, resulting in a deadlock of silence. In 2005, in article "The Drake Equation: Adding a METI Factor" he suggested that a high technology is not enough for establishing contact with Aliens because appropriate behavior directed to practical realization of sending signals is necessary too.

In 2006–2011, Zaitsev was one of the contributors to the

- ARTE's German-French TV documentation "Die Außerirdischen" ("Calling All Aliens") by Christian Schidlowski;
- Russian documentary "Overcome the Great Silence" by Vladislav Sidorov,
- Dutch documentary "Calling E.T." by Prosper de Roos,
- Dutch documentary "Alien Bits" by Prosper de Roos.

Zaitsev died on 29 November 2021.

== Awards ==
- 1985, USSR State Prize in Science.
- 1989, the Koroliov Medal of the Soviet Space Federation.
- In 1995, 6075 Zajtsev, an asteroid in the outer regions of the main-belt, was named in his honour by the discovering astronomer, Nikolai Chernykh, following a suggestion by the Institute of Theoretical Astronomy.
- 1997, the Tsiolkovsky Medal of the Russian Space Federation.
- 2003, Ukrainian jubilee medal 2500th Anniversary of Evpatoria.
