= 3169 Ostro =

Hungaria family asteroid

- Ostro imaged by the 0.7-m telescope at Heidelberg Observatory

Discovery
- Discovered by: E. Bowell
- Discovery site: Anderson Mesa Stn.
- Discovery date: 4 June 1981

Designations
- Named after: Steven J. Ostro (planetary scientist)
- Alternative designations: 1981 LA
- Minor planet category: main-belt · (inner) · Hungaria

Orbital characteristics
- Epoch 4 September 2017 (JD 2458000.5)
- Uncertainty parameter 0
- Observation arc: 63.43 yr (23,166 days)
- Aphelion: 2.0184 AU
- Perihelion: 1.7652 AU
- Semi-major axis: 1.8918 AU
- Eccentricity: 0.0669
- Orbital period (sidereal): 2.60 yr (950 days)
- Mean anomaly: 120.41°
- Mean motion: 0° 22^{m} 43.68^{s} / day
- Inclination: 24.906°
- Longitude of ascending node: 96.376°
- Argument of perihelion: 32.622°

Physical characteristics
- Dimensions: 4.662±0.118; 5.27 km (derived)
- Synodic rotation period: 6.503±0.003
- Geometric albedo: 0.5152 (derived); 0.960±0.023
- Spectral type: TS (Tholen); Xe (SMASS); B–V = 0.771; U–B = 0.306
- Absolute magnitude (H): 12.73

3169 Ostro, provisional designation 1981 LA, is a Hungaria family asteroid from the innermost regions of the asteroid belt, approximately 5 kilometers in diameter.

The asteroid was discovered on 4 June 1981, by American astronomer Edward Bowell at Lowell's Anderson Mesa Station in Flagstaff, Arizona, and named after planetary scientist Steven J. Ostro at JPL.

== Orbit and classification ==
Ostro is a member of the Hungaria family, which form the innermost dense concentration of asteroids in the Solar System. It orbits the Sun at a distance of 1.8–2.0 AU once every 2 years and 7 months (950 days). Its orbit has an eccentricity of 0.07 and an inclination of 25° with respect to the ecliptic.

== Physical characteristics ==
In the Tholen and SMASS taxonomy, Ostro is classified as a TS-type and Xe-type asteroid, respectively. It has also been characterized as an E-type asteroid.

According to the survey carried out by NASA's Wide-field Infrared Survey Explorer with its subsequent NEOWISE mission, Ostro measures 4.662 kilometers in diameter and its surface has an outstandingly high albedo of 0.960. The Collaborative Asteroid Lightcurve Link derives an albedo of 0.5152 and a diameter of 5.27 kilometers with an absolute magnitude of 12.73.

In May 2012, a rotational lightcurve of Ostro was obtained from photometric observations by American astronomer Brian Warner. Lightcurve analysis gave a well-defined rotation period of 6.503 hours with a brightness amplitude of 0.79 magnitude (U=3).

== Naming ==
This minor planet was named after American planetary scientist Steven J. Ostro at the Jet Propulsion Laboratory of the California Institute of Technology. The approved naming citation was published by the Minor Planet Center on 14 April 1987 (M.P.C. 11749).
