= 4769 Castalia =

Asteroid

- Arecibo radar image showing Castalia as a contact binary

Discovery
- Discovered by: E. F. Helin; Palomar Observatory (675)
- Discovery date: 9 August 1989

Designations
- Pronunciation: /kæˈsteɪliə/
- Named after: Castalia
- Alternative designations: 1989 PB
- Minor planet category: Apollo; NEO; PHA; Venus-crosser asteroid; Mars-crosser asteroid

Orbital characteristics
- Epoch 13 January 2016 (JD 2457400.5)
- Uncertainty parameter 0
- Observation arc: 9467 days (25.92 yr)
- Aphelion: 1.5770 AU (235.92 Gm)
- Perihelion: 0.54957 AU (82.215 Gm)
- Semi-major axis: 1.0633 AU (159.07 Gm)
- Eccentricity: 0.48313 (e)
- Orbital period (sidereal): 1.10 yr (400.46 d)
- Mean anomaly: 327.23°
- Mean motion: 0° 53^{m} 56.256^{s} / day
- Inclination: 8.8863°
- Longitude of ascending node: 325.59°
- Argument of perihelion: 121.35°
- Known satellites: 1 contact binary
- Earth MOID: 0.0199 AU (7.7 LD)

Physical characteristics
- Mean diameter: 1.4 km; 1.8×0.8 km
- Synodic rotation period: 4.095 h (0.1706 d)
- Absolute magnitude (H): 16.9

4769 Castalia (/kəˈsteɪliə/; prov. designation: 1989 PB) is a near-Earth object and potentially hazardous asteroid of the Apollo group, approximately 1.4 kilometers (0.87 miles) in diameter. It was the first asteroid to be modeled by radar imaging. It was discovered on 9 August 1989 by American astronomer Eleanor Helin (Caltech) on photographic plates taken at Palomar Observatory in California. It is named after Castalia, a nymph in Greek mythology. It is also a Mars- and Venus-crosser asteroid.

== General information ==
On 25 August 1989 Castalia passed 0.0269378 AU (4,029,840 km; 2,504,020 mi) (within eleven lunar distances) of Earth, allowing it to be observed with radar from the Arecibo Observatory by Scott Hudson (Washington State University) and Steven J. Ostro (JPL). The data allowed Hudson et al. to produce a three-dimensional model of the object. During the 1989 passage Castalia peaked at an apparent magnitude of 12.

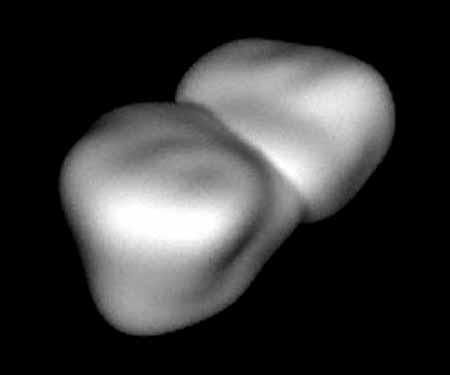
3D Model of 4769 Castalia, showing its two lobes in detail.

Castalia has a peanut shape, suggesting two approximately 800-meter-diameter pieces held together by their weak mutual gravity. Since then radar observations of other asteroids have found other contact binaries.

Castalia is a potentially hazardous asteroid (PHA) because its minimum orbit intersection distance (MOID) is less than 0.05 AU and its diameter is greater than 150 meters. The Earth-MOID is 0.0204 AU (3,050,000 km; 1,900,000 mi). Its orbit is well-determined for the next several hundred years.

Earth Approach on 22 August 2023
Date	JPL Horizons nominal geocentric distance (AU)	uncertainty region (3-sigma)
2023-Aug-22 09:21	0.11003 AU (16.460 million km)	±6 km

== See also ==
- List of notable asteroids
