= 1980 Tezcatlipoca =

Stony near-Earth asteroid

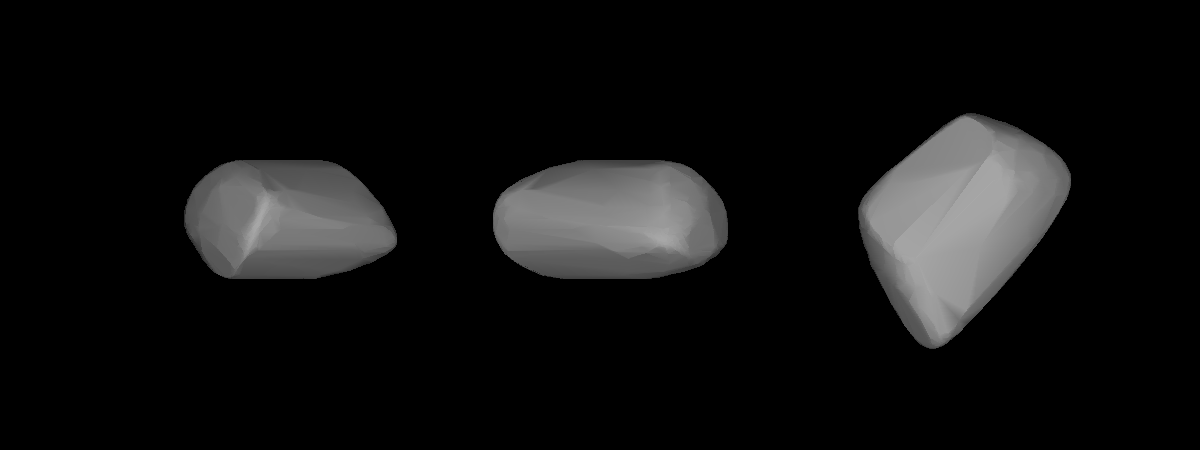
- Lightcurve-based 3D-model of Tezcatlipoca

Discovery
- Discovered by: A. G. Wilson; A.A.E. Wallenquist
- Discovery site: Palomar Obs.
- Discovery date: 19 June 1950

Designations
- Pronunciation: /ˌtɛzkætliˈpoʊkə/
- Named after: Tezcatlipoca (Aztec creator god)
- Alternative designations: 1950 LA
- Minor planet category: NEO · Amor

Orbital characteristics
- Epoch 4 September 2017 (JD 2458000.5)
- Uncertainty parameter 0
- Observation arc: 66.96 yr (24,458 days)
- Aphelion: 2.3331 AU
- Perihelion: 1.0858 AU
- Semi-major axis: 1.7094 AU
- Eccentricity: 0.3648
- Orbital period (sidereal): 2.24 yr (816 days)
- Mean anomaly: 328.60°
- Mean motion: 0° 26^{m} 27.6^{s} / day
- Inclination: 26.869°
- Longitude of ascending node: 246.57°
- Argument of perihelion: 115.49°
- Earth MOID: 0.2455 AU · 95.6 LD

Physical characteristics
- Mean diameter: 5.4+0.7 −1.3 km
- Synodic rotation period: 7.25226 h
- Pole ecliptic longitude: 324°
- Pole ecliptic latitude: −69°
- Geometric albedo: 0.22+0.13 −0.07; 0.1279; 0.132±0.028; 0.145; 0.247±0.005; 0.25 (Gehrels); 0.26±0.03; 0.47±0.43
- Spectral type: SU (Tholen); Sl (SMASS); Sw (ExploreNEOs); S (LCDB); B–V = 0.955; U–B = 0.455
- Absolute magnitude (H): 13.6 · 13.87 · 13.92 · 13.96±0.1 · 14.30±1.07

1980 Tezcatlipoca, provisional designation 1950 LA, is an eccentric, stony asteroid and near-Earth object of the Amor group, approximately 6 kilometers (4 mi) in diameter.

It was discovered on 19 June 1950, by American astronomer Albert Wilson and Swedish astronomer Åke Wallenquist at the U.S. Palomar Observatory in California. It was named after the Aztec deity Tezcatlipoca.

== Orbit and classification ==
Tezcatlipoca orbits the Sun in the inner main-belt at a distance of 1.1–2.3 AU once every 2 years and 3 months (816 days). Its orbit has an eccentricity of 0.36 and an inclination of 27° with respect to the ecliptic.

This near-Earth object has an Earth minimum orbit intersection distance of 0.2455 AU (36,700,000 km), which corresponds to 95.6 lunar distances. The body's observation arc begins with its official discovery observation at Palomar.

== Physical characteristics ==
The S-type asteroid is classified as a Sw-type by the ExploreNEOs project, and as a SU and Sl-type on the Tholen and SMASS taxonomic scheme, respectively.

Between 1988 and 2015, five rotational lightcurves of Tezcatlipoca were obtained from photometric observations and gave a well-defined, concurring rotation period of 7.25 hours with a brightness variation between 0.22 and 1.01 in magnitude, indicative of a non-spheroidal shape (U=3/n.a./2+/3-/n.a.).

According to the surveys carried out by the Japanese Akari satellite and NASA's Wide-field Infrared Survey Explorer with its subsequent NEOWISE mission, Tezcatlipoca measures between 4.36 and 6.012 kilometers in diameter and its surface has an albedo between 0.128 and 0.26. The Collaborative Asteroid Lightcurve Link agrees with the revised NEOWISE observations, that is, an albedo of 0.128 and a diameter of 6.0 kilometers with an absolute magnitude of 13.96.

== Naming ==
This minor planet was named after Tezcatlipoca, the Aztec deity of matter, whose name translates to "Smoking Mirror" in the Nahuatl language. His animal counterpart was the jaguar and his contender was Quetzálcoatl, after which the minor planet 1915 Quetzálcoatl is named. Both deities are Aztec creator gods and were depicted as twin serpents that coil round each other to produce time. The official naming citation was published by the Minor Planet Center on 15 October 1977 (M.P.C. 4237).
