= 7092 Cadmus =

Eccentric near-Earth asteroid

Discovery
- Discovered by: C. Shoemaker; E. Shoemaker
- Discovery site: Palomar Obs.
- Discovery date: 4 June 1992

Designations
- Pronunciation: /ˈkædməs/
- Named after: Cadmus (Greek mythology)
- Alternative designations: 1992 LC
- Minor planet category: NEO · Apollo; Alinda group
- Adjectives: Cadmean /kædˈmiːən/

Orbital characteristics
- Epoch 4 September 2017 (JD 2458000.5)
- Uncertainty parameter 0
- Observation arc: 36.17 yr (13,211 days)
- Aphelion: 4.3037 AU
- Perihelion: 0.7654 AU
- Semi-major axis: 2.5345 AU
- Eccentricity: 0.6980
- Orbital period (sidereal): 4.04 yr (1,474 days)
- Mean anomaly: 117.29°
- Inclination: 17.811°
- Longitude of ascending node: 57.700°
- Argument of perihelion: 93.833°
- Earth MOID: 0.0972 AU · 37.9 LD

Physical characteristics
- Mean diameter: 3±0.5 km (est. at 0.25)
- Absolute magnitude (H): 15.1

7092 Cadmus, provisional designation 1992 LC, is a highly eccentric asteroid and near-Earth object of the Apollo group, approximately 3 kilometers in diameter. It was discovered on 4 June 1992, by American astronomer couple Carolyn and Eugene Shoemaker at Palomar Observatory in California, United States. The asteroid was named after Cadmus from Greek mythology.

== Orbit and classification ==
Cadmus orbits the Sun in the central main-belt at a distance of 0.8–4.3 AU once every 4.04 years (1,474 days). Its orbit has an eccentricity of 0.70 and an inclination of 18° with respect to the ecliptic. It is a member of the Alinda group of asteroids with a 3:1 resonance with Jupiter that has excited the eccentricity of the orbit over the eons.

Due to a precovery obtained at the Australian Siding Spring Observatory, the body's observation arc already begins in 1980.

It has an Earth minimum orbit intersection distance of 0.0972 AU (14,500,000 km), which corresponds to 37.9 lunar distances. On 7 December 2056, it will pass at 0.241 AU (36,100,000 km) from Earth.

== Physical characteristics ==
As of 2016, the asteroid's effective size, its composition and albedo, as well as its rotation period and shape remain unknown. Based on an absolute magnitude of 15.1, it measures between 3 and 6 kilometers in diameter, assuming an albedo in the range of 0.05 to 0.25. Since near-Earth asteroids are often of a silicaceous rather than of a carbonaceous composition, with higher albedos, typically above 0.20, the asteroid's diameter might be on the lower end of NASA's published conversion table, as the higher the body's reflectivity (albedo), the smaller its diameter, at a constant absolute magnitude (brightness).

== Naming ==
This minor planet is named for Cadmus, the Phoenician prince, first king of Theben, and one of the greatest heroes before the days of Heracles. The minor planets 1873 Agenor, 52 Europa, 5731 Zeus, 881 Athene, 40 Harmonia and 1388 Aphrodite are named after related figures from Greek mythology.
