= Scott Hudson (electrical engineer) =

American astronomer and electrical engineer

Raymond Scott Hudson (born 1959) is a professor of electrical engineering and computer science at Washington State University. Hudson was educated at Caltech, where he received his bachelor's degree in engineering and applied science in 1985, his master's degree in electrical engineering in 1986, and his PhD in electrical engineering in 1990. His research interests include radar imaging, optical signal processing, and radar astronomy.

From August 19 to 22 of 1989, Hudson and Steven Ostro observed 4769 Castalia from the Arecibo Observatory, producing the first direct image of an asteroid.

The main-belt asteroid 5723 Hudson, discovered by Edward Bowell at Lowell Observatory in 1986, was named in his honour. The official naming citation was published on 9 September 1995 (M.P.C. 25654).
