= 3360 =

3360 may refer to:

- A.D. 3360, a year in the 4th millennium CE
- 3360 BC, a year in the 4th millennium BCE
- 3360, a number in the 3000 (number) range

== Other uses ==
- 3360 Syrinx, a near-Mars asteroid, the 3360th asteroid registered
- Nokia 3360, a cellphone
- Texas Farm to Market Road 3360, a state highway
