= 887 Alinda =

Near-Earth asteroid of the Alinda group

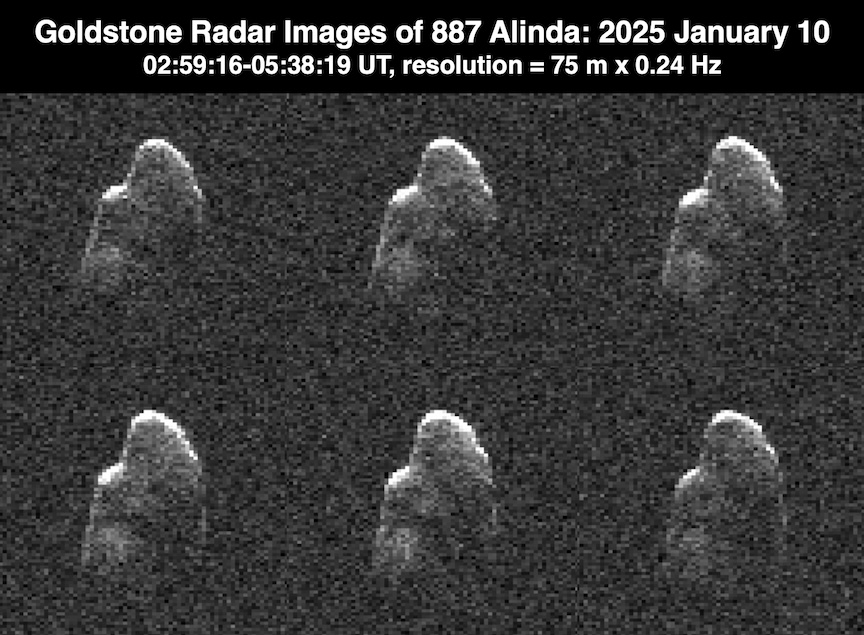
- Six doppler echo frames of Alinda taken by Goldstone Observatory on 10 January 2025

Discovery
- Discovered by: M. Wolf
- Discovery site: Heidelberg Obs.
- Discovery date: 3 January 1918

Designations
- Pronunciation: /əˈlɪndə/
- Named after: Alinda (city) or Aboriginal mythology
- Alternative designations: 1918 DB
- Minor planet category: Amor; NEO; Alinda group

Orbital characteristics
- Epoch 31 July 2016 (JD 2457600.5)
- Uncertainty parameter 0
- Observation arc: 97.42 yr (35,582 days)
- Aphelion: 3.8846 AU (581.13 Gm)
- Perihelion: 1.0731 AU (160.53 Gm)
- Semi-major axis: 2.4788 AU (370.82 Gm)
- Eccentricity: 0.56711
- Orbital period (sidereal): 3.90 yr (1425.5 d)
- Mean anomaly: 300.87°
- Mean motion: 0° 15^{m} 9.144^{s} / day
- Inclination: 9.3563°
- Longitude of ascending node: 110.55°
- Argument of perihelion: 350.34°
- Earth MOID: 0.0907705 AU (13.57907 Gm; 35.3251 LD)
- Jupiter MOID: 1.32066 AU (197.568 Gm)
- T_{Jupiter}: 3.221

Physical characteristics
- Mean radius: 2.1 km
- Synodic rotation period: 73.97 h (3.082 d)
- Geometric albedo: 0.31
- Spectral type: B–V = 0.832; U–B = 0.436; Tholen = S
- Absolute magnitude (H): 13.4

887 Alinda (/əˈlɪndə/) is a very eccentric, near-Earth asteroid with an Earth minimum orbit intersection distance (MOID) of 0.092 AU. It is the namesake for the Alinda group of asteroids and measures about 4 kilometers in diameter. The stony S-type asteroid was discovered by German astronomer Max Wolf at Heidelberg Observatory on 3 January 1918.

Due to its high eccentricity and semi-major axis of 0.57 and 2.5 AU, respectively, it is a typical Amor III asteroid. It has both, a 1:3 orbital resonance with Jupiter and a close to 4:1 resonance with Earth. As a result of the resonance with Jupiter that has excited the eccentricity of the orbit over the eons, the asteroid's orbit has evolved to spend time outside of the main-belt. It is the namesake for the Alinda group of asteroids.

Alinda made a close approaches to Earth, including a pass in January 2025, where it came within 0.0821 AU (12,280,000 km; 7,630,000 mi) of Earth.

The asteroid's name had been proposed by H. Kobol. It is uncertain whether it refers to the ancient city of Alinda in modern western Turkey, or to a mythological figure of the Aboriginal Australians.
