= Albert George Wilson =

American astronomer (1918–2012)

Minor planets discovered: 5
| 1620 Geographos | 14 September 1951 | list^{[A]} |
| 1915 Quetzálcoatl | 9 March 1953 | list |
| 1980 Tezcatlipoca | 19 June 1950 | list^{[B]} |
| 10000 Myriostos | 30 September 1951 | list |
| (118162) 1951 SX | 29 September 1951 | list |
Co-discovery made with:^{A} R. Minkowski^{B} Å. A. E. Wallenquist

Albert George Wilson (July 28, 1918 – August 27, 2012) was an American astronomer and a discoverer of minor planets.

He was born in Houston, Texas. He received his Ph.D. in mathematics from Caltech in 1947; his thesis title was Axially Symmetric Thermal Stresses in a Semi-Infinite Solid advised by Harry Bateman.

In 1949, he accepted a job at Palomar Observatory, and led the Palomar Sky Survey. In 1953, he became assistant director of Lowell Observatory, and served as director from 1954 to 1957. He later worked at Rand Corporation and other private sector positions. In 1962, he became founding editor of the astronomical magazine Icarus. In 1966, he accepted the position of associate director of McDonnell-Douglas Corporation Advanced Research Laboratories (DARL), which he held from 1966 until 1972. Wilson then became an adjunct professor at USC, teaching courses in philosophy and science until his retirement. After retiring Wilson was associated with the Institute on Man and Science and the Institute of the Future, lecturing and consulting for both groups.

He discovered a number of asteroids, and also co-discovered the periodic comet 107P/Wilson–Harrington with Robert George Harrington. The object is also known as the minor planet 4015 Wilson–Harrington.
