= Quetzalcoatl (disambiguation) =

Quetzalcoatl is a Mesoamerican deity.

Quetzalcoatl or Quetzalcóatl can also refer to:

- Quetzalcóatl International Airport, located in Nuevo Laredo, Tamaulipas, Mexico
- Quetzalcoatl (Final Fantasy), a character from the Final Fantasy video game series
- Quetzalcoatl (Fate/Grand Order - Absolute Demonic Front: Babylonia), a character from the Fate/stay night franchise
- Quetzalcoatl (Miss Kobayashi's Dragon Maid), a character from the Miss Kobayashi's Dragon Maid manga series (often shortened to and referred to as Lucoa)
- Quetzalcoatlus, a pterosaur from the Late Cretaceous of North America
- 1915 Quetzálcoatl, a minor planet
- Cē Acatl Tōpīltzin Quetzalcōātl, Lord of the Toltecs in the 10th century
- Temple of the Feathered Serpent, Teotihuacan, also known as the Temple of Quetzalcoatl, and the Feathered Serpent Pyramid
- Quetzacoatl, a mobile game by the developer 1Button SARL
- Quetzalcoatl, a 1993 album by the band J Church
- Quetzalcoatl, a song by Azaghal from the album Omega
- Quetzalcóatl (Cablebús), an air lift station in Mexico City
- Quetzalcóatl (Mexibús), a BRT station in Tecámac, Mexico
- The Plumed Serpent or Quetzalcoatl, a political novel by D. H. Lawrence
- Quetzalcoatl, a large bird-like creature that appears in Godzilla: The Series. A creature by the same name appears on a monitor screen in Godzilla: King of the Monsters
