= 6489 Golevka =

Mars-crossing asteroid

- Radar images of 6489 Golevka.

Discovery
- Discovered by: Eleanor F. Helin
- Discovery date: 10 May 1991

Designations
- Alternative designations: 1991 JX
- Minor planet category: Alinda; Apollo; PHA; Mars-crosser

Orbital characteristics
- Epoch 6 November 2001 (JD 2452219.5)
- Uncertainty parameter 0
- Observation arc: 8968 days (24.55 yr)
- Aphelion: 4.021663 AU (601.6322 Gm)
- Perihelion: 0.992813 AU (148.5227 Gm)
- Semi-major axis: 2.507238 AU (375.0775 Gm)
- Eccentricity: 0.604021
- Orbital period (sidereal): 3.97 yr (1450.1 d)
- Mean anomaly: 213.841234°
- Mean motion: 0° 14^{m} 53.744^{s} / day
- Inclination: 2.278065°
- Longitude of ascending node: 211.596909°
- Argument of perihelion: 65.939347°
- Earth MOID: 0.0288423 AU (4.31475 Gm)
- Jupiter MOID: 1.13922 AU (170.425 Gm)
- T_{Jupiter}: 3.181

Physical characteristics
- Mean diameter: 0.53 km
- Mass: 2.10×10^{11} kg
- Mean density: 2.7+0.4 −0.6 g/cm^{3}
- Synodic rotation period: 6.026 h (0.2511 d)
- Geometric albedo: 0.151 ± 0.023
- Spectral type: Q
- Absolute magnitude (H): 19.2

6489 Golevka is an Apollo, Mars-crosser, and Alinda asteroid discovered in 1991 by Eleanor F. Helin.

Its name has a complicated origin. In 1995, Golevka was studied simultaneously by three radar observatories across the world: Goldstone in California, Yevpatoria RT-70 radio telescope in Ukraine (Yevpatoria is sometimes romanized as Evpatoria) and Kashima in Japan. 'Golevka' comes from the first few letters of each observatory's name; it was proposed by the discoverer following a suggestion by Alexander L. Zaitsev.

Golevka is a small object, measuring 0.6 × 1.4 km. The radar observations revealed that it has a very strange, angular shape that looks different depending on the direction. In 2003 the Yarkovsky effect was first observed at work by high-precision radar observations of Golevka. Between 1991 and 2003, the small force of the Yarkovsky effect caused a shift of 15 kilometers (9.3 mi) from what would be expected based on only gravitational interactions. This helped evaluate the asteroid's bulk density (2.7 ± 0.5 g/cm^{3}) and mass (2.10×10^{11} kg).

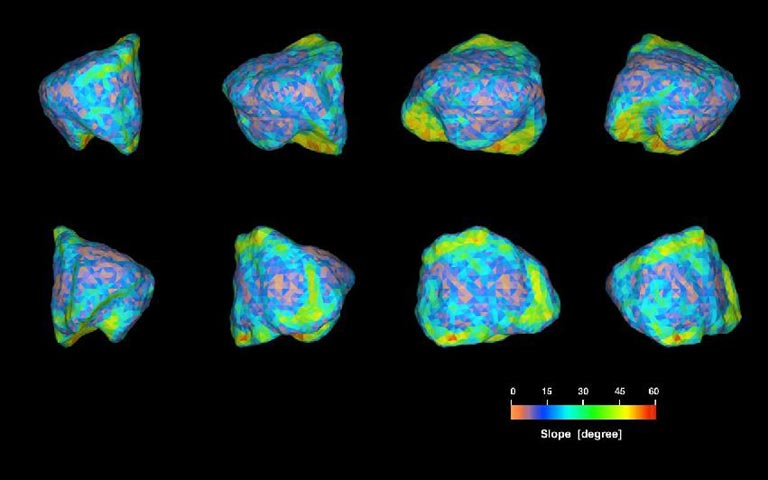
Computer-generated model of Golevka based on Arecibo radar data

Golevka approaches Earth to 0.05 AU (7,500,000 km; 4,600,000 mi) in 2046, 0.10 AU in 2069, and 0.11 AU in 2092. On the other hand, Golevka's collision probability with any planet is negligible for at least the next nine centuries. Its orbit is strikingly similar to that of 4179 Toutatis in eccentricity, semi-major axis, and inclination. However, Toutatis is better known due to a close approach to Earth in 2004.
