= (53319) 1999 JM8 =

Largest known potentially hazardous near-Earth asteroid

(53319) 1999 JM_{8}
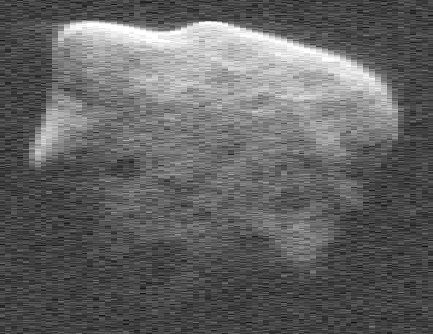
- Radar image of 1999 JM_{8} taken at Arecibo Observatory

Discovery
- Discovered by: LINEAR
- Discovery site: Lincoln Lab's ETS
- Discovery date: 13 May 1999

Designations
- Alternative designations: 1990 HD_{1}
- Minor planet category: NEO · PHA · Apollo; Mars-crosser

Orbital characteristics
- Epoch 2022-Aug-09 (JD 2459800.5)
- Uncertainty parameter 0
- Observation arc: 31.03 yr
- Aphelion: 4.4741 AU
- Perihelion: 0.9759 AU
- Semi-major axis: 2.7236 AU
- Eccentricity: 0.6417
- Orbital period (sidereal): 4.49 yr (1,642 days)
- Mean anomaly: 19.009°
- Mean motion: 0° 13^{m} 8.4^{s} / day
- Inclination: 13.842°
- Longitude of ascending node: 133.62°
- Argument of perihelion: 166.83°
- Earth MOID: 0.0258 AU (10.0 LD)
- Jupiter MOID: 0.85 AU

Physical characteristics
- Dimensions: 5 km 5.4±1.2 km 6.4 km 7 km
- Synodic rotation period: 136±2 h
- Geometric albedo: 0.02±0.01; 0.03 (derived)
- Spectral type: SMASS = X: · C X(Tholen)
- Absolute magnitude (H): 15.00 · 15.14±0.38 · 15.2 · 16.5

(53319) 1999 JM_{8} is an asteroid, slow rotator and tumbler, classified as a near-Earth object and potentially hazardous asteroid (PHA) of the Apollo group, approximately 7 kilometers (4 miles) in diameter, making it the largest PHA known to exist. It was discovered on 13 May 1999, by astronomers of the Lincoln Near-Earth Asteroid Research at the Lincoln Laboratory's Experimental Test Site near Socorro, New Mexico.

== Orbit and classification ==
1999 JM_{8} orbits the Sun at a distance of 1.0–4.5 AU once every 4 years and 6 months (1,644 days; semi-major axis of 2.73 AU). Its orbit has an eccentricity of 0.64 and an inclination of 14° with respect to the ecliptic. This makes it also a Mars-crossing asteroid.

The body's observation arc begins with its first identification as 1990 HD_{1} at Palomar Observatory in April 1990, more than 9 years prior to its official discovery observation at Socorro.

=== Close approaches ===
1999 JM_{8} has an Earth minimum orbital intersection distance of 0.0258 AU (3,860,000 km; 10.0 LD) It passed closer than 0.20 AU to the Earth five times in the last century (0.033 AU in 1990), but its next closest approach in the 21st century will be in 2075 at 0.256 au (38,300,000 km; 23,800,000 mi; 100 LD) and in August 2137 at 0.0764 au (11,430,000 km; 7,100,000 mi; 29.7 LD). For comparison, the planet Venus passed 103 LD (40,000,000 km; 25,000,000 mi) from Earth in 2022.

== Physical characteristics ==
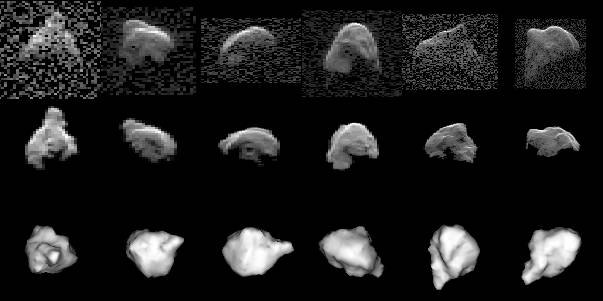
Radar images and computer models of (53319) 1999 JM_{8}

In the SMASS and Tholen classification, 1999 JM_{8} is an X-type asteroid. It has also been characterized as a carbonaceous C-type asteroid, which seems more likely due to its exceptionally low albedo (see below).

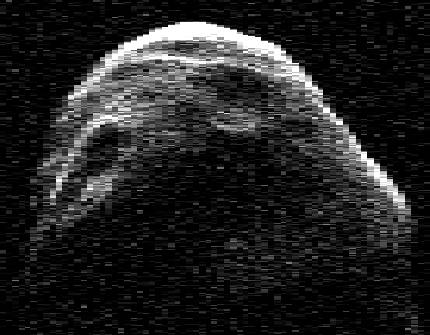
A radar image of (53319) 1999 JM_{8}, showing two large craters or basins on its surface

=== Rotation period ===
Radar imaging by Goldstone and Arecibo observatories revealed that 1999 JM_{8} has an unusually slow and possibly chaotic rotation period, similar to that of asteroid 4179 Toutatis.

In July 1999, a rotational lightcurve of 1999 JM_{8} was obtained from photometric observations. It gave a period of 136±2 hours with a brightness amplitude of 0.7 magnitude (U=2), and suggested that the body is in a non-principal axis rotation, commonly known as tumbling.

=== Diameter and albedo ===
1999 JM_{8} measures between 5 and 7 kilometers in diameter and its surface has an exceptionally low albedo of 0.02. The Collaborative Asteroid Lightcurve Link derives an albedo of 0.03 and adopts a diameter of 7 kilometers based on an absolute magnitude of 15.2.

== Numbering and naming ==
This minor planet was numbered by the Minor Planet Center on 16 February 2003. As of 2018, it has not been named.
