= 1927 Suvanto =

Stony main-belt asteroid

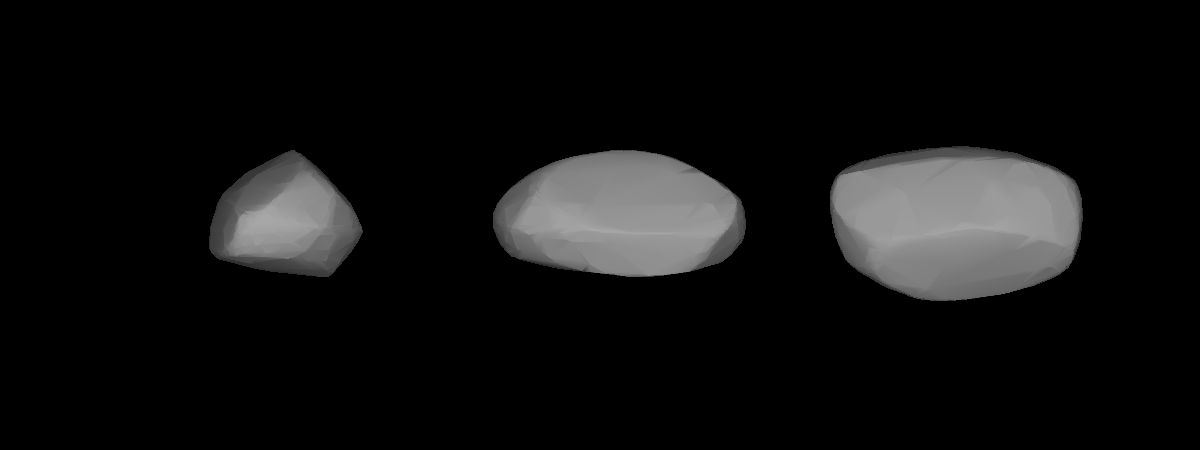
- Lightcurve-based 3D-model of Suvanto

Discovery
- Discovered by: R. Suvanto
- Discovery site: Turku Obs.
- Discovery date: 18 March 1936

Designations
- Named after: Rafael Suvanto (discoverer; posthumous)
- Alternative designations: 1936 FP · 1930 XN
- Minor planet category: main-belt · Eunomia

Orbital characteristics
- Epoch 4 September 2017 (JD 2458000.5)
- Uncertainty parameter 0
- Observation arc: 86.21 yr (31,487 days)
- Aphelion: 3.0392 AU
- Perihelion: 2.2631 AU
- Semi-major axis: 2.6512 AU
- Eccentricity: 0.1464
- Orbital period (sidereal): 4.32 yr (1,577 days)
- Mean anomaly: 352.49°
- Mean motion: 0° 13^{m} 41.88^{s} / day
- Inclination: 13.372°
- Longitude of ascending node: 27.146°
- Argument of perihelion: 95.875°

Physical characteristics
- Dimensions: 11.55 km (calculated); 11.841±0.188 km 12.42±1.28 km 12.494±0.155 km
- Synodic rotation period: 8.163±0.003 h 8.164±0.002 h
- Geometric albedo: 0.289±0.080; 0.2609±0.0380; 0.193±0.157; 0.21 (assumed)
- Spectral type: S
- Absolute magnitude (H): 11.6 · 11.93 · 12.0 · 12.22±0.50

1927 Suvanto, provisional designation 1936 FP, is a stony Eunomian asteroid from the central region of the asteroid belt, approximately 12 kilometers in diameter. It was discovered on 18 March 1936, by Finnish astronomer Rafael Suvanto at the Turku Observatory in Southwest Finland. The asteroid was posthumously named in honor of the discoverer.

== Orbit and classification ==
Suvanto is a member of the Eunomia family, the most prominent family in the intermediate main-belt, which mostly consists of stony S-type asteroids. It orbits the Sun at a distance of 2.3–3.0 AU once every 4 years and 4 months (1,577 days). Its orbit has an eccentricity of 0.15 and an inclination of 13° with respect to the ecliptic.

== Physical characteristics ==
It will pass 0.048 AU (7,200,000 km) from 2 Pallas on 24 May 2074, which will allow a refinement to the known mass of Pallas.

Photometric observations of Suvanto collected during 2004–2005 show a rotation period of 8.163 hours with a brightness variation of 0.60 magnitude.

== Naming ==
This minor planet was named in memory of Rafael Suvanto (credited discoverer), assistant of Yrjö Väisälä. Suvanto died during the last days of the Finnish Winter War of in the Battle of Summa (also see naming of asteroid 1928 Summa). The approved naming citation was published by the Minor Planet Center on 1 August 1980 (M.P.C. 5450).
