= Åke Wallenquist =

Swedish astronomer (1904–1994)

Asteroids discovered: 1
1980 Tezcatlipoca	June 19, 1950	with A. G. Wilson

Åke Anders Edvard Wallenquist (January 16, 1904 – April 8, 1994) was a Swedish astronomer. He worked at the Dutch Bosscha Observatory in Indonesia between 1928 and 1935, and became assistant professor at Uppsala's Kvistabergs Observatorium (Kvistaberg Observatory) in 1948. He worked originally on double stars but it was the open star clusters and their properties that became his main area of research. Wallenquist was a very active member of both the Royal Swedish Academy of Sciences in Stockholm and the Royal Swedish Society of Sciences in Uppsala. From the 1950s onwards, he was the leading writer of popular astronomy in Sweden among the professional astronomers. His books inspired generations of young people to become interested in astronomy.

Asteroid 2114 Wallenquist was named in his honour.
