= 3360 Syrinx =

Apollo asteroid

(3360) Syrinx
Discovery
- Discovered by: Eleanor F. Helin; R. Scott Dunbar
- Discovery date: 4 November 1981

Designations
- Pronunciation: /ˈsɪrɪŋks/
- Named after: Syrinx
- Alternative designations: 1981 VA
- Minor planet category: Apollo; Mars crosser; Alinda family

Orbital characteristics
- Epoch 13 January 2016 (JD 2457400.5)
- Uncertainty parameter 0
- Observation arc: 12556 days (34.38 yr)
- Aphelion: 4.30603 AU (644,173,000 km)
- Perihelion: 0.62791 AU (93,934,000 km)
- Semi-major axis: 2.46697 AU (369,053,000 km)
- Eccentricity: 0.74547
- Orbital period (sidereal): 3.87 yr (1415.3 d)
- Mean anomaly: 315.35°
- Mean motion: 0° 15^{m} 15.732^{s} / day
- Inclination: 21.154°
- Longitude of ascending node: 242.561°
- Argument of perihelion: 63.457°
- Earth MOID: 0.107877 AU (16,138,200 km)

Physical characteristics
- Dimensions: 1.8 km
- Mean radius: 0.9 km
- Geometric albedo: 0.17
- Absolute magnitude (H): 15.9

3360 Syrinx (originally designated 1981 VA) is an Apollo and Mars crosser asteroid discovered in 1981. It approaches Earth to within 0.27 AU (40 million km; 110 LD) three times in the 21st century: 0.22 AU (33 million km; 86 LD) in 2039, 40 million km in 2070, and 0.16 AU (24 million km; 62 LD) in 2085.

On 20 September 2012, it closely encountered Earth at a distance of 0.4192 AU (62,710,000 km; 38,970,000 mi), peaking in brightness at an apparent magnitude of 17.0. In opposition on 23 November 2012, it brightened to magnitude 16.0.

It is a member of the Alinda group of asteroids with a 3:1 resonance with Jupiter that has excited the eccentricity of the orbit over the eons. As an Alinda asteroid it makes approaches to Jupiter, Earth, and Venus.

For a time, it was the lowest numbered asteroid that had not been named. In November 2006, this distinction passed to 3708 Socus, and in May 2021 to (4596) 1981 QB.

== See also ==
- List of asteroids
- Syrinx
