= 1915 Quetzálcoatl =

Near-Earth Alinda asteroid

Discovery
- Discovered by: A. G. Wilson
- Discovery site: Palomar Obs.
- Discovery date: 9 March 1953

Designations
- Pronunciation: /ˌkɛtsælkoʊˈɑːtəl/
- Named after: Quetzalcoatl (Mesoamerican deity)
- Alternative designations: 1953 EA
- Minor planet category: NEO · Amor · Alinda

Orbital characteristics
- Epoch 4 September 2017 (JD 2458000.5)
- Uncertainty parameter 0
- Observation arc: 51.59 yr (18,842 days)
- Aphelion: 3.9958 AU
- Perihelion: 1.0928 AU
- Semi-major axis: 2.5443 AU
- Eccentricity: 0.5705
- Orbital period (sidereal): 4.06 yr (1,482 days)
- Mean anomaly: 12.497°
- Inclination: 20.402°
- Longitude of ascending node: 162.95°
- Argument of perihelion: 347.88°
- Earth MOID: 0.1102 AU · 42.9 LD

Physical characteristics
- Dimensions: 0.40 km 0.5 km
- Synodic rotation period: 4.9 h
- Geometric albedo: 0.21; 0.31
- Spectral type: Tholen = SMU · SMU; B–V = 0.784; U–B = 0.430
- Absolute magnitude (H): 18.88 · 18.88±0.11 · 18.90 · 18.97

1915 Quetzálcoatl, provisional designation 1953 EA, is a very eccentric, stony asteroid (S-type) classified as near-Earth object, about half a kilometer in diameter. It was discovered on 9 March 1953, by American astronomer Albert George Wilson at Palomar Observatory, California. It was named for Quetzalcoatl from Aztec mythology.

== Orbit and classification ==
Quetzálcoatl is an Amor asteroid – a subgroup of near-Earth asteroids that approach the orbit of Earth from beyond, but do not cross it – and a member of the Alinda family of highly eccentric asteroids. It orbits the Sun at a distance of 1.1–4.0 AU with a period of around 4 years. The osculating orbit as of 2017 has a period just over 4 years, but the period varies because Quetzálcoatl is near the 3:1 orbital resonance with Jupiter (and possibly because it is near the 1:4 resonance with Earth). Its orbit has an eccentricity of 0.57 and an inclination of 20° with respect to the ecliptic.

When it was discovered in March 1953 it had a magnitude around 15, but in recent times its magnitude rarely dips below 20 because even when it is near perihelion it is far from Earth. After the 1953 close approach there were others every four years until March 1981, but the next one will not be until 77 years (19 orbits averaging 4,05 years) later, in February 2062, when its magnitude will be about 17. Its magnitude will get to around 16 (a bit less bright than in 1953) 52 years (13 orbits) later in 2114. Another close approach will occur 39 years (10 orbits) later in 2153 (average period 3.9 years). In the 285 years from 1953 to 2238 it makes 72 orbits, giving an average period of 3.96 years (quite close to a third of Jupiter's period, which comes to 3.95 years).

Its Earth Minimum orbit intersection distance (MOID) is 0.1102 AU which translates into 42.9 lunar distances. On 24 February 2062, it will make a close approach and pass by Earth at a distance of 0.1339 AU (20,000,000 km).

== Physical characteristics ==
In the Tholen classification, Quetzálcoatl is classified as a rare SMU-subtype of the broader S-type asteroids. Its mean-diameter is between 0.4 and 0.5 kilometers. It has a rotation period of 4.9 hours and an albedo of 0.21–0.31. In 1981, this object was observed with radar from the Arecibo Observatory at a distance of 0.09 AU. The measured radar cross-section was 0.02 km^{2}.

== Naming ==
This minor planet is named after the feathered serpent Quetzalcoatl, the Mesoamerican deity of wisdom and culture who brought learning to the Toltec people. The official naming citation was published by the Minor Planet Center on 1 June 1975 (M.P.C. 3827).
