= Alinda asteroid =

Group of near-Earth asteroids

The Alinda asteroids are a dynamical group of asteroids with a semi-major axis of about 2.5 AU and an orbital eccentricity approximately between 0.4 and 0.65. The namesake is 887 Alinda, discovered by Max Wolf in 1918.

These objects are held in this region by the 3:1 orbital resonance with Jupiter (2.502 AU), which results in their orbits being close to a 1:4 resonance with Earth (2.520 AU). An object in this resonance has its orbital eccentricity steadily increased by gravitational interactions with Jupiter until it eventually has a close encounter with an inner planet that breaks the resonance.

Some Alindas have perihelia very close to Earth's orbit, resulting in a series of close encounters at almost exactly four-year intervals, due to the 1:4 near resonance.

One consequence of this is that if an Alinda asteroid happens to be in an unfavorable position for viewing at the time of its close approach to Earth (for instance, at a small elongation from the Sun), then this situation can persist for decades. Indeed, as of 2010, the Alinda asteroid 1915 Quetzálcoatl had been observed only once since 1985.

Another consequence is that some of these asteroids make repeated relatively close approaches to Earth, making them good subjects for study by Earth-based radar. Examples are 4179 Toutatis and 6489 Golevka, as well as 2019 MO, which impacted Earth in June 2019.

== Dynamic age ==
The 3:1 resonance with Jupiter causes a repeating growth in the eccentricity of the asteroid's orbit. Dynamically young members have an eccentricity ranging from about 0.30 to 0.34 staying mostly in the asteroid belt ranging 1.7–3.4 AU from the Sun. Older members such as 8709 Kadlu have eccentricities between 0.465 and 0.475 and cross the orbit of Mars. (8709 Kadlu makes approaches close enough to Jupiter, Mars, and Earth to be gravitationally nudged.) The oldest members with eccentricities between 0.57 and 0.75 cross the orbit of Earth. 3360 Syrinx is the most eccentric of the Alinda group with an eccentricity of 0.7 and the orbit has a dynamically short life expectancy.

== List of members ==
Designation	a	e	Refs
887 Alinda	2.48422	0.56356	JPL · MPC
1429 Pemba	2.55185	0.33858	JPL · MPC
1550 Tito	2.54673	0.30984	JPL · MPC
1607 Mavis	2.54783	0.30741	JPL · MPC
1915 Quetzálcoatl	2.54207	0.57170	JPL · MPC
2608 Seneca	2.5035	0.57620	JPL · MPC
3360 Syrinx	2.46803	0.74295	JPL · MPC
3628 Božněmcová	2.53691	0.30052	JPL · MPC
3806 Tremaine	2.54058	0.31301	JPL · MPC
4179 Toutatis	2.51005	0.63423	JPL · MPC
5847 Wakiya	2.54442	0.30086	JPL · MPC
5864 Montgolfier	2.55866	0.32007	JPL · MPC
6318 Cronkite	2.51002	0.46522	JPL · MPC
(6322) 1991 CQ	2.51628	0.47349	JPL · MPC
6489 Golevka	2.50768	0.60382	JPL · MPC
(6491) 1991 OA	2.50959	0.58946	JPL · MPC
7092 Cadmus	2.52493	0.70202	JPL · MPC
7345 Happer	2.45047	0.32467	JPL · MPC
(7568) 1988 VJ_{2}	2.52739	0.33216	JPL · MPC
(7569) 1989 BK	2.54950	0.30348	JPL · MPC
7638 Gladman	2.53634	0.31606	JPL · MPC
(8201) 1994 AH2	2.53362	0.70851	JPL · MPC
8709 Kadlu	2.53497	0.48432	JPL · MPC
(9047) 1991 QF	2.52479	0.31661	JPL · MPC

== See also ==
- Amor asteroid
- Apollo asteroid
- Aten asteroid
