= Rafael Suvanto =

Finnish astronomer

Rafael Suvanto (June 28, 1909 in Turku – March 9, 1940 in Kärstilänjärvi) was a Finnish astronomer.

Suvanto was the assistant of Yrjö Väisälä. He died in the Winter War. His rank was lieutenant.

The Minor Planet Center credits him with the discovery of the asteroid 1927 Suvanto, dedicated to him posthumously, carried out on March 18, 1936.
