= 4179 Toutatis =

Near-Earth asteroid of the Apollo and Alinda group

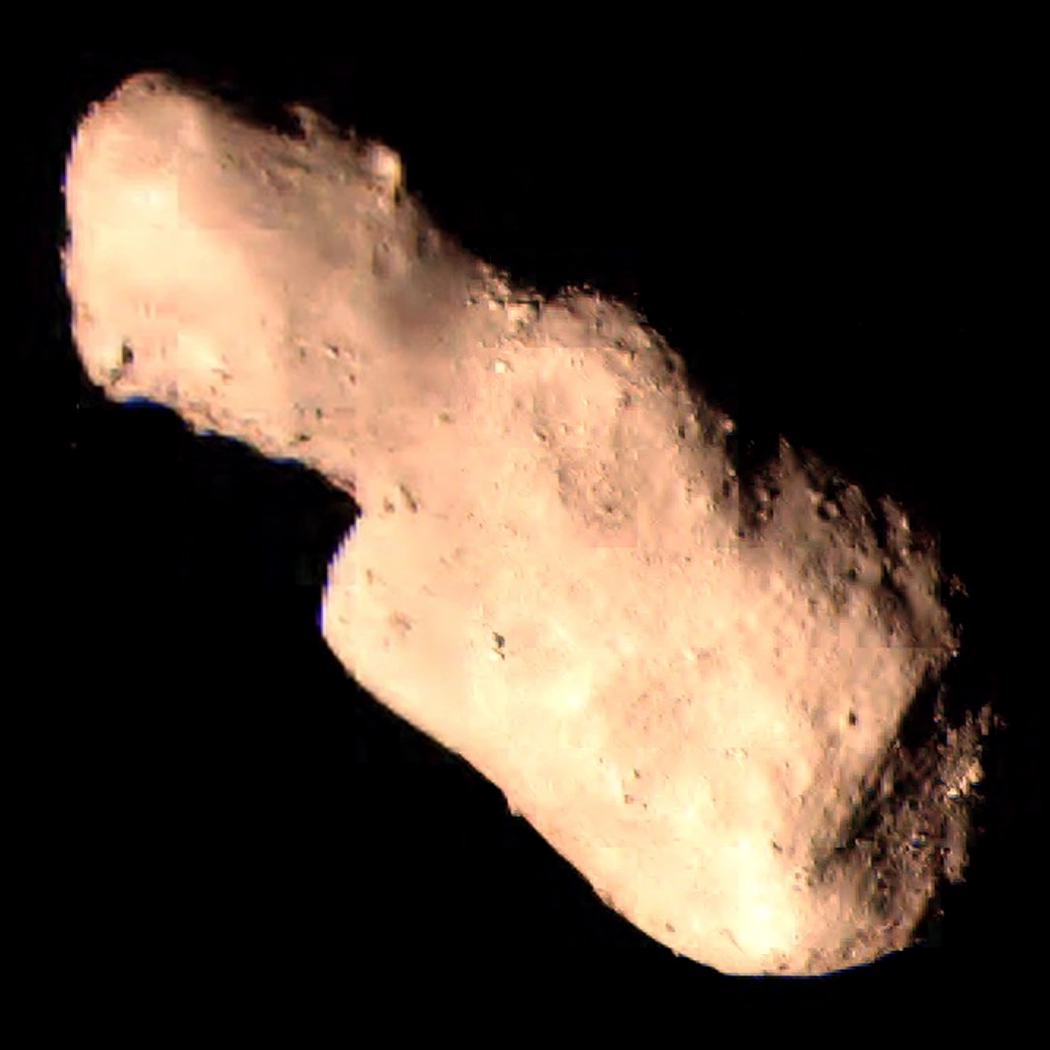
- Colorised image of Toutatis by Chang'e 2 during its flyby

Discovery
- Discovered by: Christian Pollas
- Discovery site: Caussols
- Discovery date: 4 January 1989

Designations
- Pronunciation: /taʊˈteɪtɪs/
- Named after: Toutatis (Celtic mythology)
- Alternative designations: 1989 AC; 1934 CT
- Minor planet category: NEO; Apollo; PHA; Alinda; Mars-crosser
- Adjectives: Toutatian

Orbital characteristics
- Epoch 27 November 2008 (JD 2454797.5)
- Uncertainty parameter 0
- Observation arc: 83.29 yr (30,422 days)
- Earliest precovery date: 10 February 1934
- Aphelion: 4.1242 AU
- Perihelion: 0.9399 AU
- Semi-major axis: 2.5321 AU
- Eccentricity: 0.6288
- Orbital period (sidereal): 4.03 yr (1,472 days)
- Mean anomaly: 5.1220°
- Mean motion: 0° 14^{m} 40.56^{s} / day
- Inclination: 0.4460°
- Longitude of ascending node: 124.30°
- Argument of perihelion: 278.75°
- Earth MOID: 0.0064 AU (2.5 LD)

Physical characteristics
- Dimensions: 4.75 × 1.95 km; 4.26 × 2.03 × 1.70 km
- Mean diameter: 2.45 km
- Mass: 1.9×10^{13} kg
- Mean density: 2.5 g/cm^{3}
- Synodic rotation period: 176 h (7.3 d)
- Geometric albedo: 0.13
- Spectral type: Sk (SMASSII)
- Apparent magnitude: 8.8–22.4
- Absolute magnitude (H): 15.30

4179 Toutatis (provisional designation 1989 AC) is an elongated, stony asteroid and slow rotator, classified as a near-Earth object and potentially hazardous asteroid of the Apollo asteroid group, approximately 2.5 kilometers in diameter. Discovered by French astronomer Christian Pollas at Caussols in 1989, the asteroid was named after Toutatis from Celtic mythology.

Toutatis is also a Mars-crosser asteroid with a chaotic orbit produced by a 3:1 resonance with the planet Jupiter, a 1:4 resonance with the planet Earth, and frequent close approaches to the terrestrial planets, including Earth. In December 2012, Toutatis passed within about 18 lunar distances of Earth. The Chinese lunar probe Chang'e 2 flew by the asteroid at a distance of 3.2 kilometers and a relative velocity of 10.73 km/s. Toutatis approached Earth again in 2016, but will not make another notably close approach until 2069.

== Properties ==
Toutatis was first sighted on 10 February 1934, and was named 1934 CT, but was lost soon afterwards. It remained a lost asteroid for several decades until it was rediscovered on 4 January 1989 by French astronomer Christian Pollas, who named it after the Celtic god of tribal protection Toutatis (Teutates). The name of this god is very familiar in France due to the catchphrase Par Toutatis! of the Gauls in the comics series Asterix.

The spectral properties suggest that this is an S-type, or stony asteroid, consisting primarily of silicates. It has a moderate Bond albedo of 0.13. Radar imagery shows that Toutatis is a highly irregular body consisting of two distinct lobes, with maximum widths of about 4.6 km and 2.4 km, respectively. It is hypothesized that Toutatis formed from two originally separate bodies which coalesced at some point (a contact binary), with the resultant asteroid being compared to a rubble pile.

Its rotation combines two separate periodic motions into a non-periodic result; to someone on the surface of Toutatis, the Sun would seem to rise and set in apparently random locations and at random times at the asteroid's horizon. It has a rotation period around its long axis (P_{ψ}) of 5.38 days. This long axis is precessing with a period (P_{φ}) of 7.38 days. The asteroid may have lost most of its original angular momentum and entered into this tumbling motion as a result of the YORP effect.

== Orbit ==
Animation of 4179 Toutatis's orbit around the Sun 4179 Toutatis · Sun · Earth · Jupiter

With a semimajor axis of 2.5294 AU, or roughly 2.5 times the distance between Earth and the Sun, Toutatis has a 3:1 orbital resonance with Jupiter and a near-1:4 resonance with Earth making it a member of the Alinda asteroid group. It thus completes one orbit around the Sun for every 4.02 annual orbits of Earth. The gravitational perturbations caused by frequent close approaches to the terrestrial planets lead to chaotic behavior in the orbit of Toutatis, making precise long-term predictions of its location progressively inaccurate over time. Estimates in 1993 put the Lyapunov time horizon for predictability at around 50 years, after which the uncertainty region becomes larger with each close approach to a planet. Without the perturbations from the terrestrial planets the Lyapunov time would be close to 10,000 years. The initial observations that showed its chaotic behavior were made by Wiśniewski.

The low inclination (0.47°) of the orbit allows frequent transits, where the inner planets Mercury, Venus, Earth, and Mars can appear to cross the Sun as seen from the perspective of Toutatis. Earth did this in January 2009, July 2012, July 2016 and 2020.

=== Close approaches and collision risk ===
Close approaches
Year	AU	LD
1985	0.28	109
1988	0.12	45
1992	0.02	9
1996	0.03	14
2000	0.07	29
2004	0.01	4
2008	0.05	20
2012	0.05	18
2016	0.25	98
2065	0.36	142
2069	0.02	8

Toutatis makes frequent close approaches to Earth, with a currently minimum possible distance (Earth MOID) of just 0.006 AU (2.3 times as far as the Moon). The approach on 29 September 2004 was particularly close, at 0.0104 AU (within 4 lunar distances) from Earth, presenting a good opportunity for observation, with Toutatis having an apparent magnitude of 8.8 at its brightest. A close approach of 0.0502 AU (7,510,000 km; 4,670,000 mi) happened on 9 November 2008. The most recent close approach was on 12 December 2012, at a distance of 0.046 AU (6,900,000 km; 4,300,000 mi), with a magnitude of 10.7. At magnitude 10.7, Toutatis was not visible to the naked eye, but just visible to experienced observers using high-end binoculars. During the 2012 encounter Toutatis was recovered on 21 May 2012, by the Siding Spring Survey at apparent magnitude 18.9. A close approach will be 5 November 2069, at 0.01985 AU (2,970,000 km).

Given that Toutatis makes many close approaches to Earth, such as in 1992, 1996, 2000, 2004, 2008, 2012, and 2016, it is listed as a potentially hazardous object. With an uncertainty parameter of 0, the orbit of Toutatis is very well determined for the next few hundred years. The probability of the orbit intersecting Earth is essentially zero for at least the next six centuries. The likelihood of collision in the distant future is considered to be very small. As a planet-crossing asteroid, Toutatis is likely to be ejected from the inner Solar System within a few million years. In 2004 a chain e-mail falsely claimed that Toutatis had a 63% chance of impacting Earth then. In fact, Toutatis passed by at 1.5 million kilometres, or about four Earth–Moon distances, as predicted.

In 2006 Toutatis came closer than 2 AU to Jupiter; its orbit lies inside of Jupiter's. In the 2100s, it will approach Jupiter many times at a similar distance.

History of close approaches of large near-Earth objects since 1908 ^{(A)}

PHA	Date	Approach distance (lunar dist.)			Abs. mag (H)	Diameter ^{(C)} (m)	Ref ^{(D)}
PHA	Date	Nomi- nal^{(B)}	Mini- mum	Maxi- mum	Abs. mag (H)	Diameter ^{(C)} (m)	Ref ^{(D)}
(33342) 1998 WT24	1908-12-16	3.542	3.537	3.547	17.9	556–1795	data
(458732) 2011 MD5	1918-09-17	0.911	0.909	0.913	17.9	556–1795	data
(7482) 1994 PC1	1933-01-17	2.927	2.927	2.928	16.8	749–1357	data
69230 Hermes	1937-10-30	1.926	1.926	1.927	17.5	668–2158	data
69230 Hermes	1942-04-26	1.651	1.651	1.651	17.5	668–2158	data
(137108) 1999 AN10	1946-08-07	2.432	2.429	2.435	17.9	556–1795	data
(33342) 1998 WT24	1956-12-16	3.523	3.523	3.523	17.9	556–1795	data
(163243) 2002 FB3	1961-04-12	4.903	4.900	4.906	16.4	1669–1695	data
(192642) 1999 RD32	1969-08-27	3.627	3.625	3.630	16.3	1161–3750	data
(143651) 2003 QO104	1981-05-18	2.761	2.760	2.761	16.0	1333–4306	data
2017 CH1	1992-06-05	4.691	3.391	6.037	17.9	556–1795	data
(170086) 2002 XR14	1995-06-24	4.259	4.259	4.260	18.0	531–1714	data
(33342) 1998 WT24	2001-12-16	4.859	4.859	4.859	17.9	556–1795	data
4179 Toutatis	2004-09-29	4.031	4.031	4.031	15.3	2440–2450	data
(671294)2014 JO25	2017-04-19	4.573	4.573	4.573	17.8	582–1879	data
(137108) 1999 AN10	2027-08-07	1.014	1.010	1.019	17.9	556–1795	data
(35396) 1997 XF11	2028-10-26	2.417	2.417	2.418	16.9	881–2845	data
(154276) 2002 SY50	2071-10-30	3.415	3.412	3.418	17.6	714–1406	data
(164121) 2003 YT1	2073-04-29	4.409	4.409	4.409	16.2	1167–2267	data
(385343) 2002 LV	2076-08-04	4.184	4.183	4.185	16.6	1011–3266	data
(52768) 1998 OR2	2079-04-16	4.611	4.611	4.612	15.8	1462–4721	data
(33342) 1998 WT24	2099-12-18	4.919	4.919	4.919	17.9	556–1795	data
(85182) 1991 AQ	2130-01-27	4.140	4.139	4.141	17.1	1100	data
314082 Dryope	2186-07-16	3.709	2.996	4.786	17.5	668–2158	data
(137126) 1999 CF9	2192-08-21	4.970	4.967	4.973	18.0	531–1714	data
(290772) 2005 VC	2198-05-05	1.951	1.791	2.134	17.6	638–2061	data
^{(A)} List includes near-Earth approaches of less than 5 lunar distances (LD) of objects with H brighter than 18.^{(B)} Nominal geocentric distance from the Earth's center to the object's center (Earth radius≈0.017 LD).^{(C)} Diameter: estimated, theoretical mean-diameter based on H and albedo range between X and Y.^{(D)} Reference: data source from the JPL SBDB, with AU converted into LD (1 AU≈390 LD)^{(E)} Color codes: unobserved at close approach observed during close approach upcoming approaches

== Physical characteristics ==
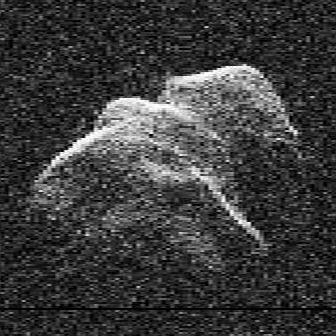
Goldstone radar image (1996)

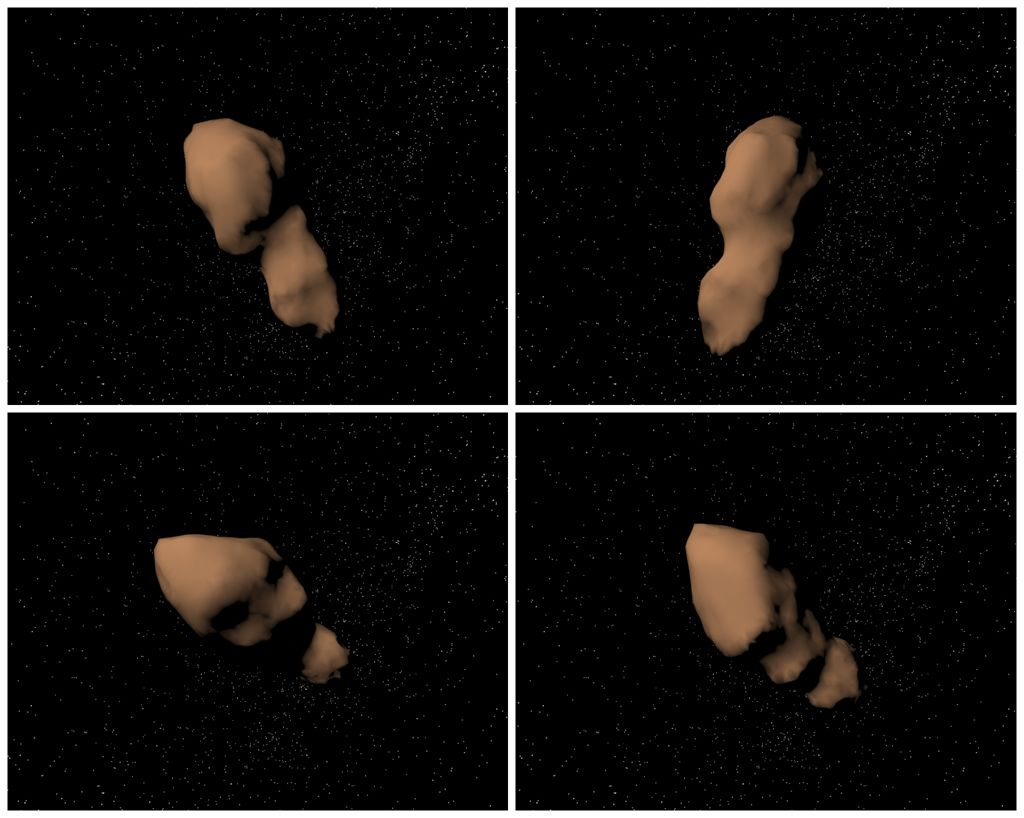
Computer model of Toutatis

Large amounts of data of Toutatis were obtained during Chang'e 2's flyby. Toutatis is not a monolith, but most likely a coalescence of shattered fragments. This bifurcated asteroid is shown to be mainly consisting of a head (small lobe) and a body (large lobe). The two major parts are not round in shape, and their surfaces have a number of large facets. In comparison with radar models, the proximate observations from Chang'e 2's flyby have revealed several discoveries concerning Toutatis, among which the presence of the giant basin at the big end appears to be one of the most compelling geological features, and the sharply perpendicular silhouette in the neck region that connects the head and body is also quite novel. A large number of boulders and several short linear structures are also apparent on the surface.

=== Giant basin ===
The giant basin at the big end of Toutatis has a diameter of ~805 m, suggesting that one or more impactors may have collided with it there. The most significant feature is the ridge around the largest basin. The wall of this basin has a relatively high density of lineaments, some of which seem to be concentric to the basin. These ridges are indicative of an internal structure of small bodies and most of the ridges near the largest basin at the big end are most likely related to the huge stress energy during impact.

== Observation ==
Toutatis has been observed with radar imaging from the Arecibo Observatory and the Goldstone Solar System Radar during the asteroid's prior Earth flybys in 1992, 1996, 2000, 2004, and 2008. It was also observed with radar during the December 2012 flyby and observed more distant flyby with radar in December 2016. After 2016, Toutatis will not pass close to Earth again until 2069.

Resolution of the radar images is as fine as 3.75 m per pixel, providing data to model Toutatis's shape and spin state.

== Exploration ==
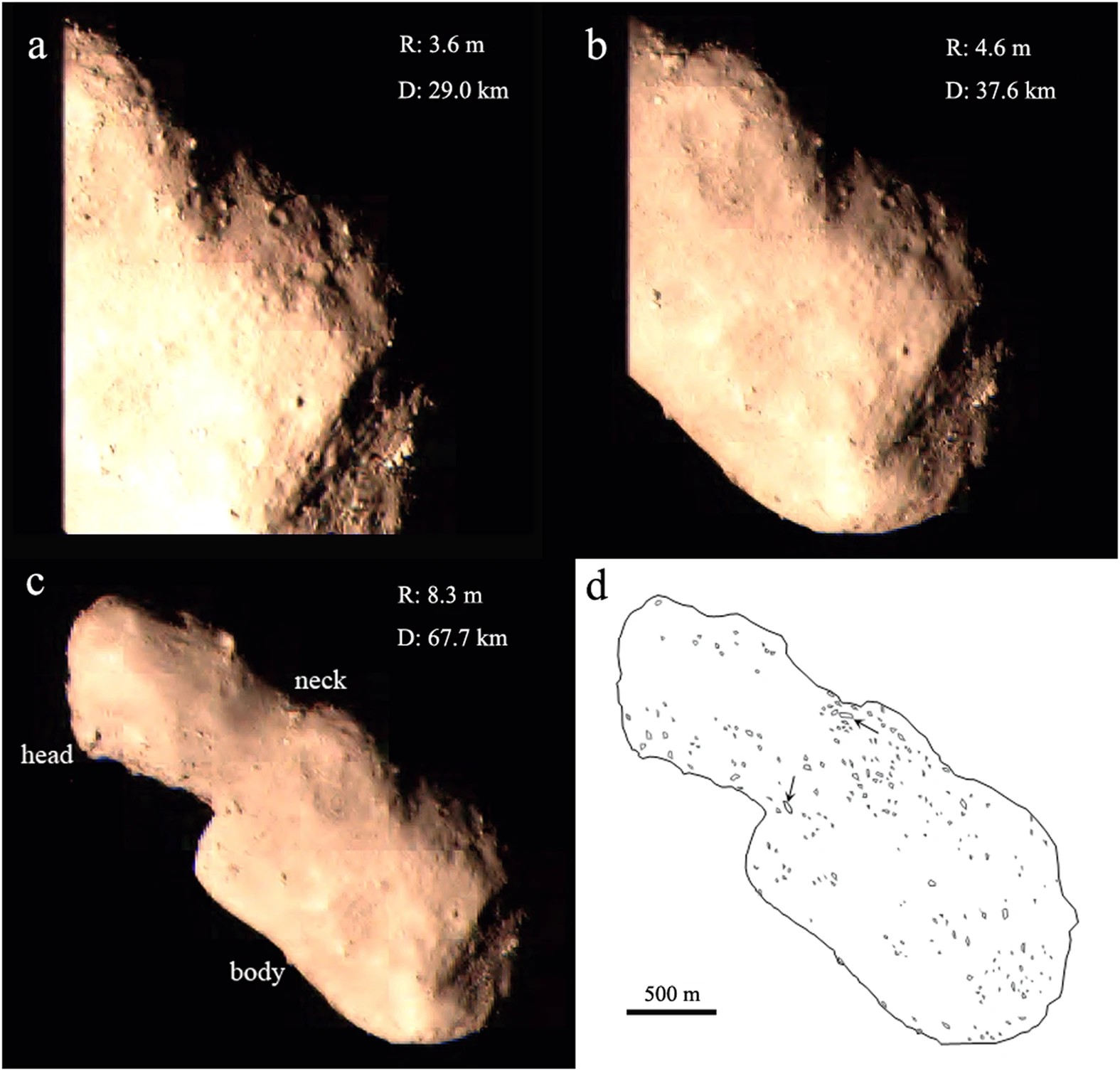
Images of Toutatis taken by Chang'e 2 probe

The Chinese lunar probe Chang'e 2 departed from the Sun–Earth L2 point in April 2012 and made a flyby of Toutatis on 13 December 2012, with closest approach being 3.2 kilometers and a relative velocity of 10.73 km/s, when Toutatis was near its closest approach to Earth. It took several pictures of the asteroid.

== See also ==
- List of asteroid close approaches to Earth
- List of minor planets and comets visited by spacecraft
