= Kirkwood gap =

Property of asteroid orbits

Histogram showing the four most prominent Kirkwood gaps and a possible division into inner, middle and outer main-belt asteroids: inner main-belt (a < 2.5 AU) intermediate main-belt (2.5 AU < a < 2.82 AU) outer main-belt (a > 2.82 AU)

A plot of inner solar system asteroids and planets as of 2026 May 15, in a manner that exposes the Kirkwood gaps. Similar to the position plot, planets (with trajectories) are gold, Jupiter being the outer most in this view. Various asteroid classes are colour coded: 'generic' main-belt asteroids are white. Inside the main belt, the near-Earth asteroids are shown in yellow and the Hungarias in orange. Outside the main belt are the Cybeles (blue), Hildas (purple), and the Trojans (pink). All object position vectors have been normalized to the length of the object's semi-major axis. The Kirkwood gaps are visible in the main belt.

A Kirkwood gap is a gap or dip in the distribution of the semi-major axes (or equivalently of the orbital periods) of the orbits of main-belt asteroids. They correspond to the locations of orbital resonances with Jupiter. The gaps were first noticed in 1866 by Daniel Kirkwood, who also correctly explained their origin in the orbital resonances with Jupiter.

For example, there are very few asteroids with semimajor axis near 2.50 AU, period 3.95 years, which would make three orbits for each orbit of Jupiter (hence, called the 3:1 orbital resonance). Other orbital resonances correspond to orbital periods whose lengths are simple fractions of Jupiter's. The weaker resonances lead only to a depletion of asteroids, while spikes in the histogram are often due to the presence of a prominent asteroid family (see List of asteroid families).

Most of the Kirkwood gaps are depleted, unlike the mean-motion resonances (MMR) of Neptune or Jupiter's 3:2 resonance, that retain objects captured during the giant planet migration of the Nice model. The loss of objects from the Kirkwood gaps is due to the overlapping of the ν_{5} and ν_{6} secular resonances within the mean-motion resonances. The orbital elements of the asteroids vary chaotically as a result and evolve onto planet-crossing orbits within a few million years. The 2:1 MMR has a few relatively stable islands within the resonance, however. These islands are depleted due to slow diffusion onto less stable orbits. This process, which has been linked to Jupiter and Saturn being near a 5:2 resonance, may have been more rapid when Jupiter's and Saturn's orbits were closer together.

More recently, a relatively small number of asteroids have been found to possess high eccentricity orbits which do lie within the Kirkwood gaps. Examples include the Alinda and Griqua groups. These orbits slowly increase their eccentricity on a timescale of tens of millions of years, and will eventually break out of the resonance due to close encounters with a major planet. This is why asteroids are rarely found in the Kirkwood gaps.

== Main gaps ==
The most prominent Kirkwood gaps are located at mean orbital radii of:

- 1.780 AU (5:1 resonance)
- 2.065 AU (4:1 resonance)
- 2.502 AU (3:1 resonance), home to the Alinda group of asteroids
- 2.825 AU (5:2 resonance)
- 2.958 AU (7:3 resonance)
- 3.279 AU (2:1 resonance), Hecuba gap, home to the Griqua group of asteroids.
- 3.972 AU (3:2 resonance), home to the Hilda asteroids.
- 4.296 AU (4:3 resonance), home to the Thule group of asteroids.

Weaker and/or narrower gaps are also found at:

- 1.909 AU (9:2 resonance)
- 2.258 AU (7:2 resonance)
- 2.332 AU (10:3 resonance)
- 2.706 AU (8:3 resonance)
- 3.031 AU (9:4 resonance)
- 3.077 AU (11:5 resonance)
- 3.474 AU (11:6 resonance)
- 3.517 AU (9:5 resonance)
- 3.584 AU (7:4 resonance)
- 3.702 AU (5:3 resonance).

== Asteroid zones ==
The gaps are not seen in a simple snapshot of the locations of the asteroids at any one time because asteroid orbits are elliptical, and many asteroids still cross through the radii corresponding to the gaps. The actual spatial density of asteroids in these gaps does not differ significantly from the neighboring regions.

The main gaps occur at the 3:1, 5:2, 7:3, and 2:1 mean-motion resonances with Jupiter. An asteroid in the 3:1 Kirkwood gap would orbit the Sun three times for each Jovian orbit, for instance. Weaker resonances occur at other semi-major axis values, with fewer asteroids found than nearby. (For example, an 8:3 resonance for asteroids with a semi-major axis of 2.71 AU).

The main or core population of the asteroid belt may be divided into the inner and outer zones, separated by the 3:1 Kirkwood gap at 2.5 AU, and the outer zone may be further divided into middle and outer zones by the 5:2 gap at 2.82 AU:

- 4:1 resonance (2.06 AU)
  - Zone I population (inner zone)
- 3:1 resonance (2.5 AU)
  - Zone II population (middle zone)
- 5:2 resonance gap (2.82 AU)
  - Zone III population (outer zone)
- 2:1 resonance gap (3.28 AU)

4 Vesta is the largest asteroid in the inner zone, 1 Ceres and 2 Pallas in the middle zone, and 10 Hygiea in the outer zone. 87 Sylvia is probably the largest Main Belt asteroid beyond the outer zone.

== See also ==
- Orbital resonance
- Alinda group
- Cybele group
- Griqua group
