= Radar astronomy =

Observing nearby astronomical objects by analyzing reflected microwaves

Radar astronomy is a technique of observing nearby astronomical objects by reflecting radio waves or microwaves off target objects and analyzing their reflections. Radar astronomy differs from radio astronomy in that the latter is a passive observation (i.e., receiving only) and the former an active one (transmitting and receiving). Radar systems have been conducted for six decades applied to a wide range of Solar System studies. The radar transmission may either be pulsed or continuous. The strength of the radar return signal is proportional to the inverse fourth-power of the distance. Upgraded facilities, increased transceiver power, and improved apparatus have increased observational opportunities.

Radar techniques provide information unavailable by other means, such as testing general relativity by observing Mercury and providing a refined value for the astronomical unit. Radar images provide information about the shapes and surface properties of solid bodies, which cannot be obtained by other ground-based techniques.

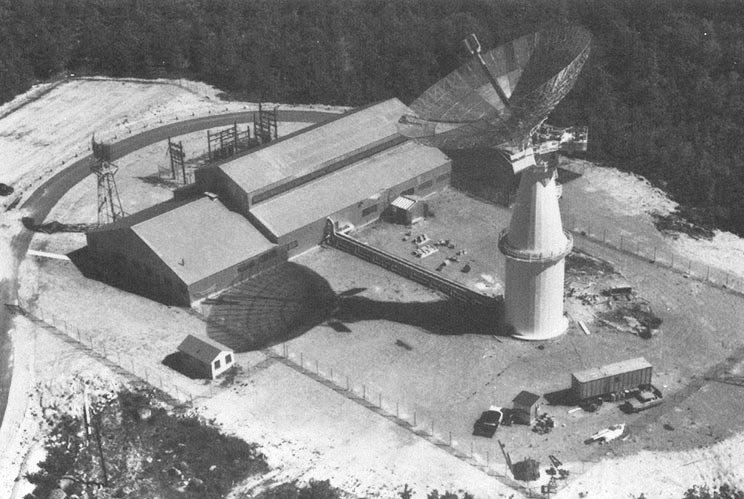
Millstone Hill Radar in 1958

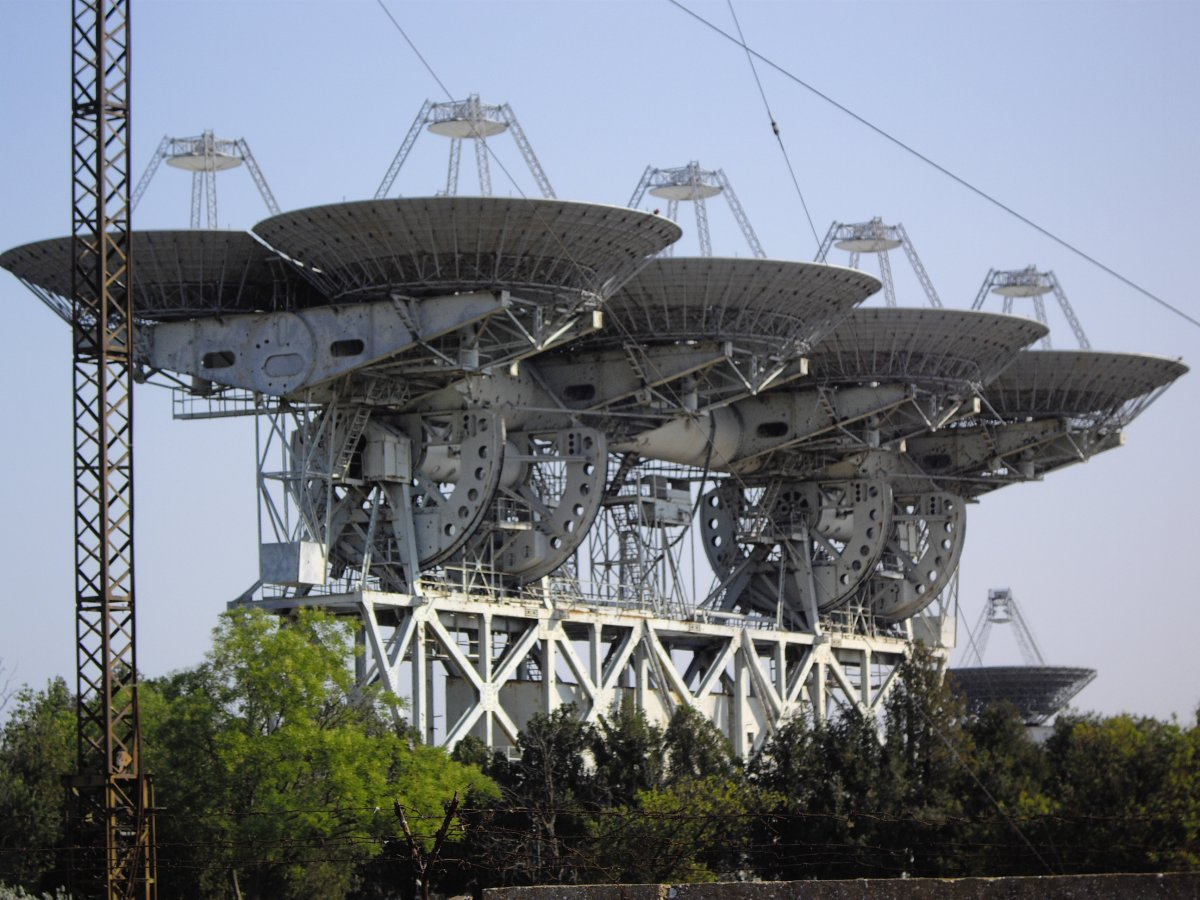
Early planetary radar Pluton, USSR, 1960

Relying upon high-powered terrestrial radars (of up to one megawatt), radar astronomy is able to provide extremely accurate astrometric information on the structure, composition and movement of Solar System objects. This aids in forming long-term predictions of asteroid-Earth impacts, as illustrated by the object 99942 Apophis. In particular, optical observations measure where an object appears in the sky, but cannot measure the distance with great accuracy (relying on parallax becomes more difficult when objects are small or poorly illuminated). Radar, on the other hand, directly measures the distance to the object (and how fast it is changing). The combination of optical and radar observations normally allows the prediction of orbits at least decades, and sometimes centuries, into the future.

In August 2020 the Arecibo Observatory (Arecibo Planetary Radar) suffered a structural cable failure, leading to the collapse of the main telescope in December of that year.

As of 2023, there were two radar astronomy facilities in regular use, the Goldstone Solar System Radar and Evpatoria Planetary Radar.

== Advantages ==
- Control of attributes of the signal [i.e., the waveform's time/frequency modulation and polarization]
- Resolve objects spatially.
- Delay-Doppler measurement precision.
- Optically opaque penetration.
- Sensitive to high concentrations of metal or ice.

== Disadvantages ==
The maximum range of astronomy by radar is very limited, and is confined to the Solar System. This is because the signal strength drops off very steeply with distance to the target, the small fraction of incident flux that is reflected by the target, and the limited strength of transmitters. The distance to which the radar can detect an object is proportional to the square root of the object's size, due to the one-over-distance-to-the-fourth dependence of echo strength. Radar could detect something ~1 km across a large fraction of an AU away, but at 8-10 AU, the distance to Saturn, we need targets at least hundreds of kilometers wide. It is also necessary to have a relatively good ephemeris of the target before observing it.

== History ==
The Moon is comparatively close and was detected by radar soon after the invention of the technique in 1946. Measurements included surface roughness and later mapping of shadowed regions near the poles.

The next easiest target is Venus. This was a target of great scientific value, since it could provide an unambiguous way to measure the size of the astronomical unit, which was needed for the nascent field of interplanetary spacecraft. In addition such technical prowess had great public relations value, and was an excellent demonstration to funding agencies. So there was considerable pressure to squeeze a scientific result from weak and noisy data, which was accomplished by heavy post-processing of the results, utilizing the expected value to tell where to look. This led to early claims (from Lincoln Laboratory, Jodrell Bank, and Vladimir A. Kotelnikov of the USSR) which are now known to be incorrect. All of these agreed with each other and the conventional value of AU at the time, 149467000 km.

The first unambiguous detection of Venus was made by the Jet Propulsion Laboratory on 10 March 1961. JPL established contact with the planet Venus using a planetary radar system from 10 March to 10 May 1961. Using both velocity and range data, a new value of 149598500±500 km was determined for the astronomical unit. Once the correct value was known, other groups found echos in their archived data that agreed with these results.

The Sun has been detected several times starting in 1959. Frequencies are usually between 25 and 38 MHz, much lower than for interplanetary work. Reflections from both the photosphere and the corona were detected.

The following is a list of planetary bodies that have been observed by this means:

- Mercury - Improved value for the distance from the earth observed (GR test). Rotational period, libration, surface mapping, esp. of polar regions.
- Venus - first radar detection in 1961. Rotation period, gross surface properties. The Magellan mission mapped the entire planet using a radar altimeter.
- Earth - numerous airborne and spacecraft radars have mapped the entire planet, for various purposes. One example is the Shuttle Radar Topography Mission, which mapped large parts of the surface of Earth at 30 m resolution.
- Mars - Mapping of surface roughness from Arecibo Observatory. The Mars Express mission carries a ground-penetrating radar.
- Jupiter System - Galilean satellites
- Saturn System - Rings and Titan from Arecibo Observatory, mapping of Titan's surface and observations of other moons from the Cassini spacecraft.

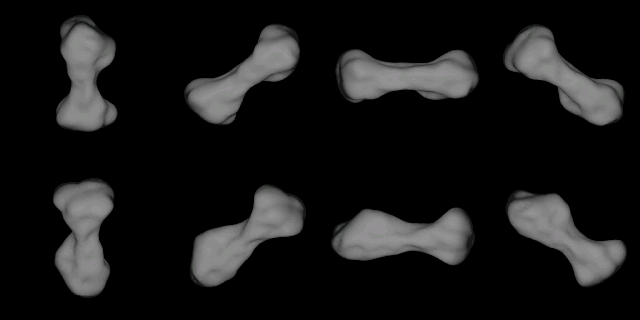
Computer model of asteroid (216) Kleopatra, based on radar analysis.

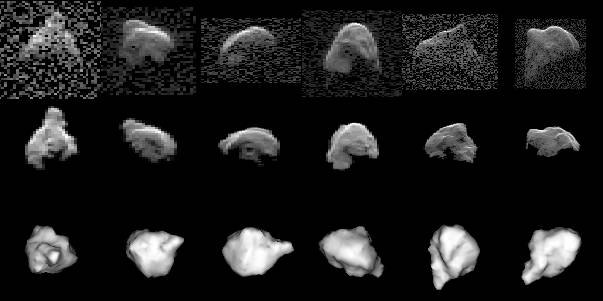
Radar images and computer model of asteroid 1999 JM8

== Asteroids and comets ==
Radar provides the ability to study the shape, size and spin state of asteroids and comets from the ground. Radar imaging has produced images with up to 7.5-meter resolution. With sufficient data, the size, shape, spin and radar albedo of the target asteroids can be extracted.

As of 2016, only 19 comets had been studied by radar, including 73P/Schwassmann-Wachmann, along with radar observations of 612 Near-Earth asteroids and 138 Main belt asteroids. By 2025, this had grown to 138 main-belt asteroids, 1148 near-Earth asteroids, and 23 comets.

Many bodies are observed during their close flyby of Earth.

While operational the Arecibo Observatory provided information about Earth threatening comet and asteroid impacts, allowing impact and near miss predictions decades into the future such as those for Apophis and other bodies. Being smaller, the Goldstone Solar System Radar is less sensitive and unable to provide the same predictive capacity.

== Telescopes and facilities ==
The Goldstone Solar System Radar is the only planetary radar in current regular operation. Others are or were:

- The planetary radar at Arecibo Observatory, which collapsed in 2020.
- The Soviet planetary radar at the Pluton complex, since dismantled.
- The Millstone Hill and Haystack radio telescopes of the Haystack Observatory made radar observations from 1958 through at least 1970.
- The Yevpatoria RT-70 radio telescope is equipped with a powerful transmitter, and has been used in bi-static radar observations.

There are proposals and prototypes for possible additional radars:

- The Green Bank Observatory is investigating a Ku-band radar for its 100 meter radio telescope. Its low power prototype has imaged the moon.
- China is developing a planetary radar. Their initial phase has imaged the moon.

== See also ==
- Radar
- 6489 Golevka
- 4179 Toutatis
