= Minor planet =

Astronomical object that is neither a planet nor a comet

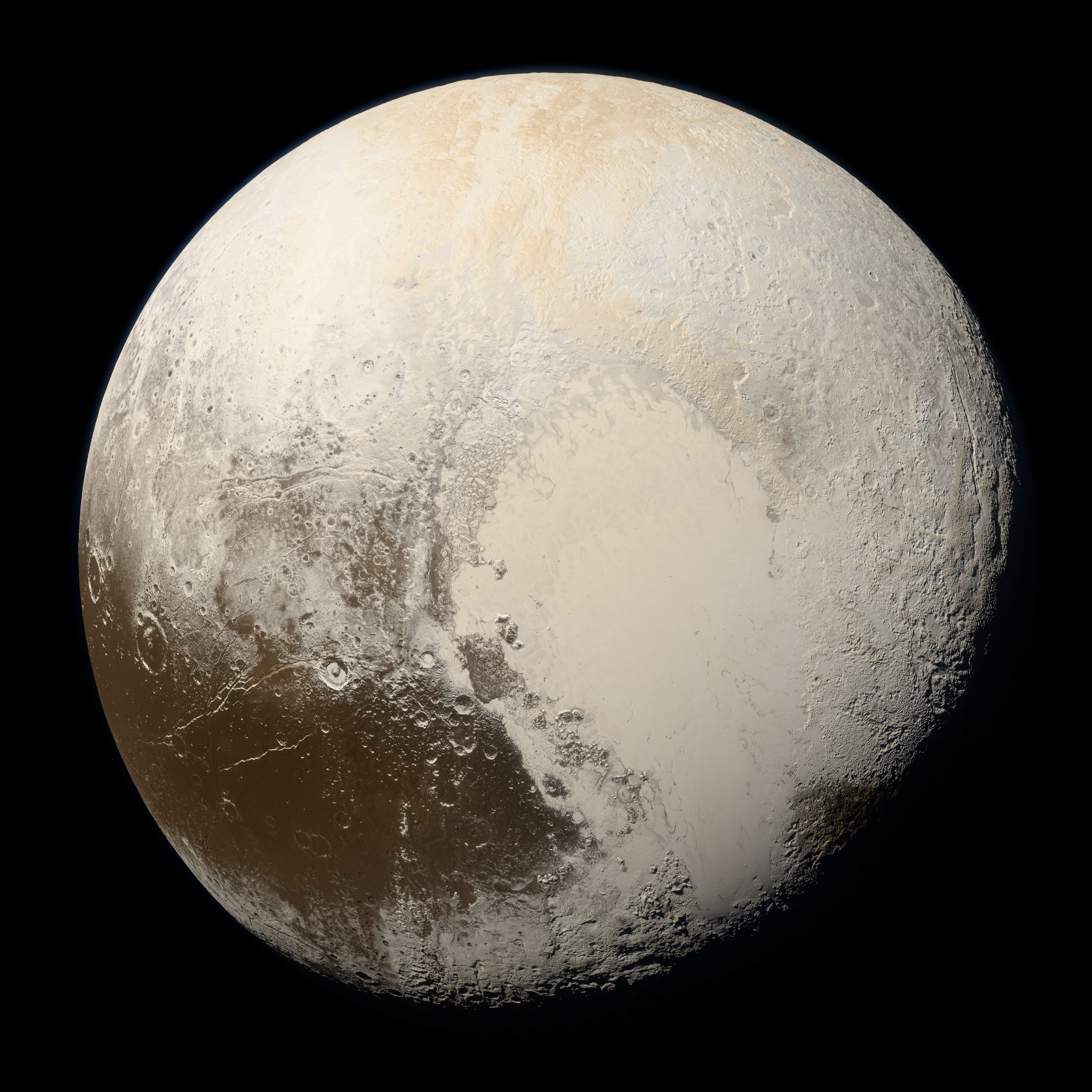
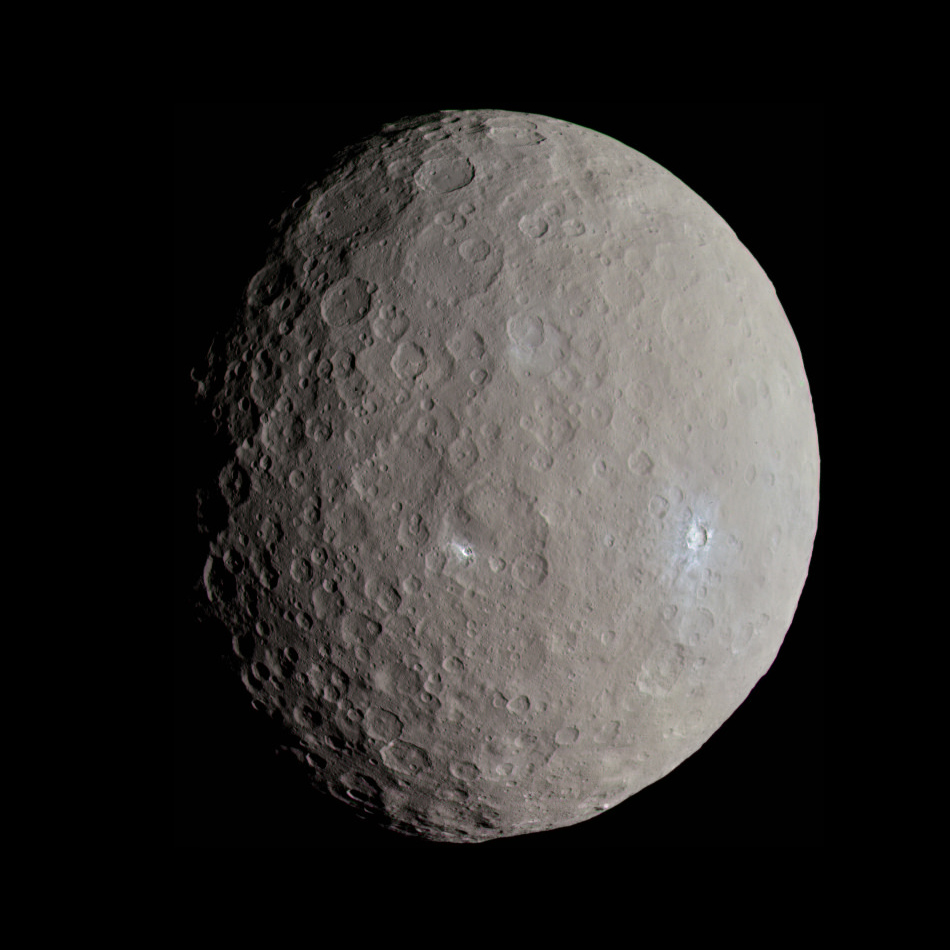
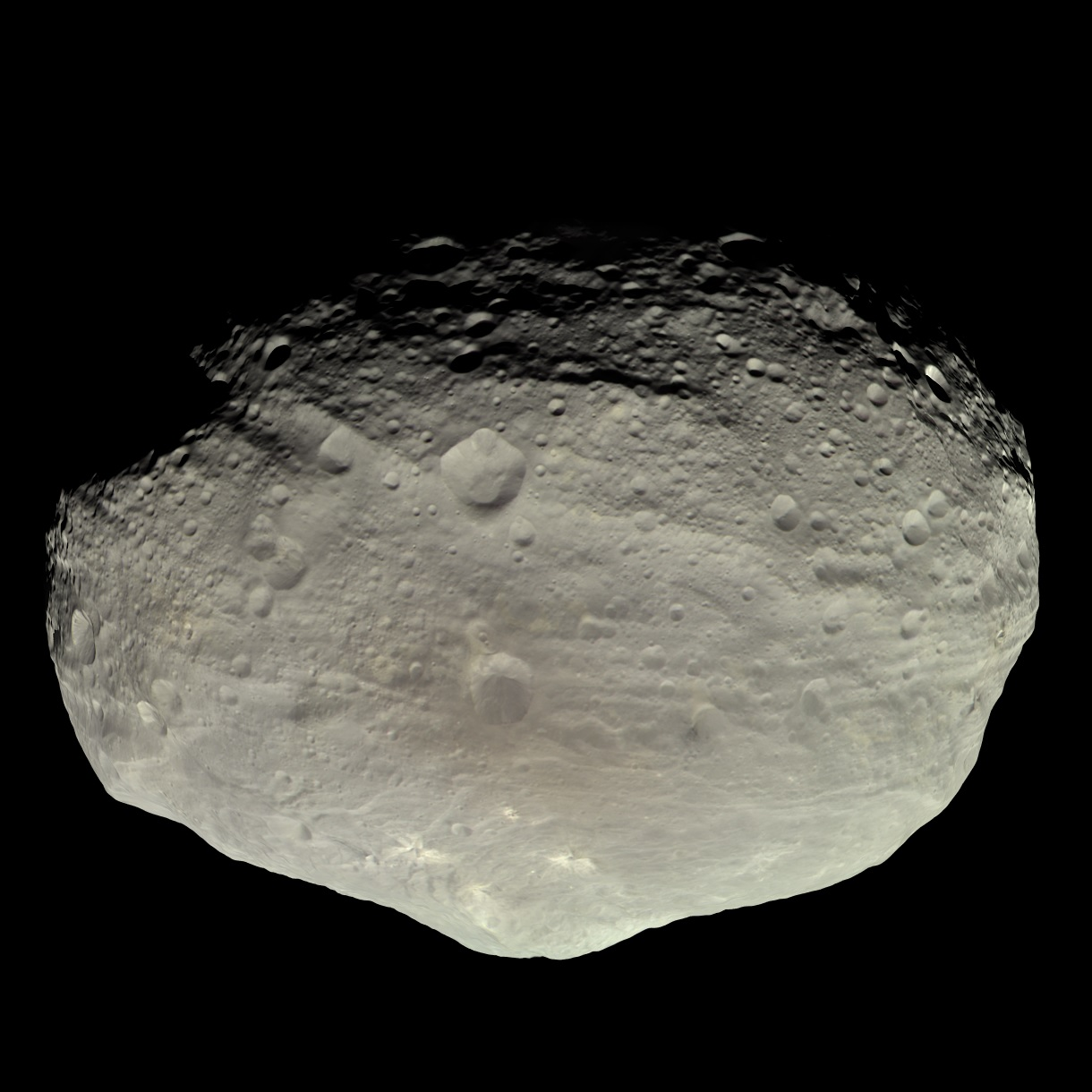
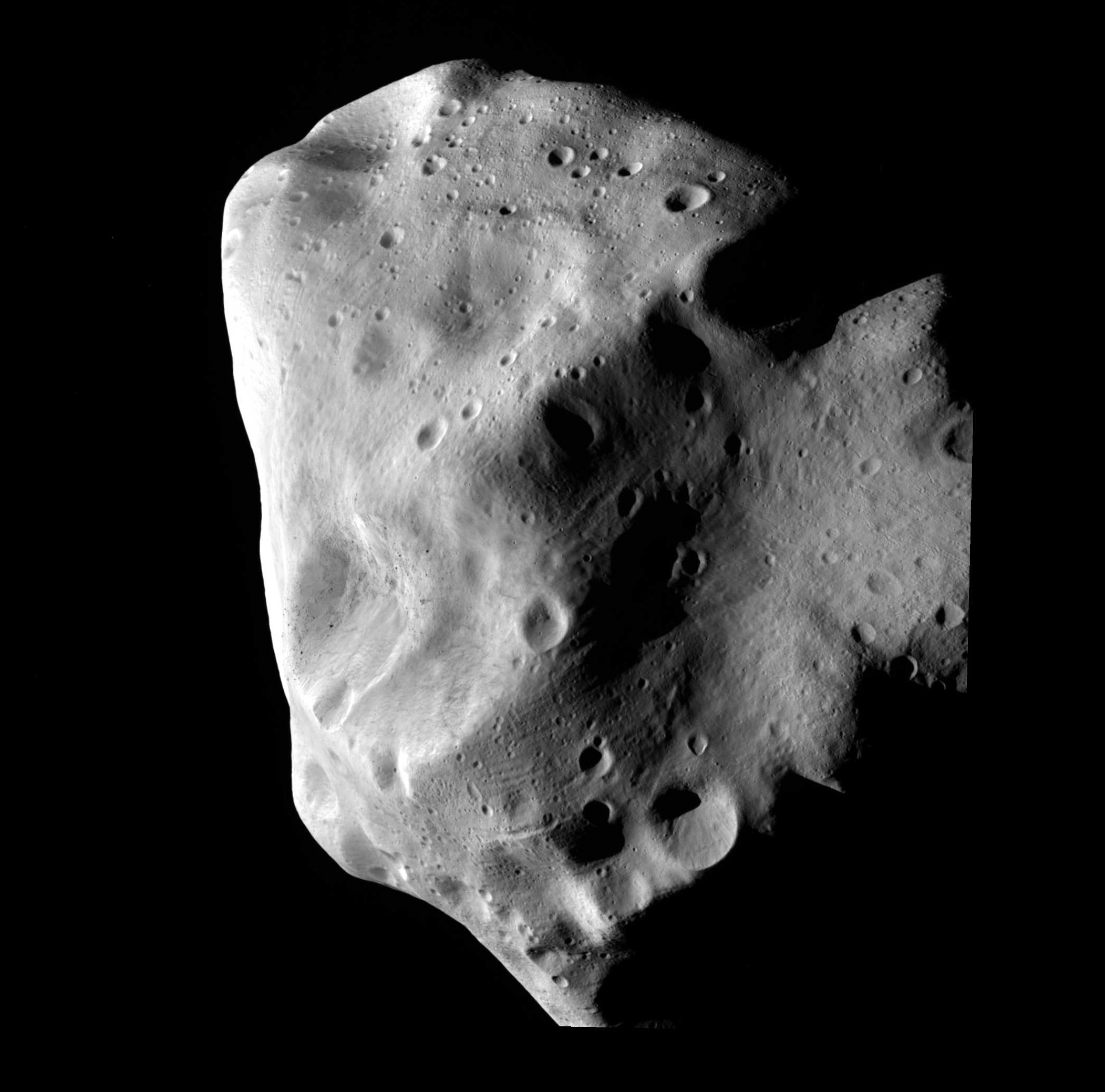
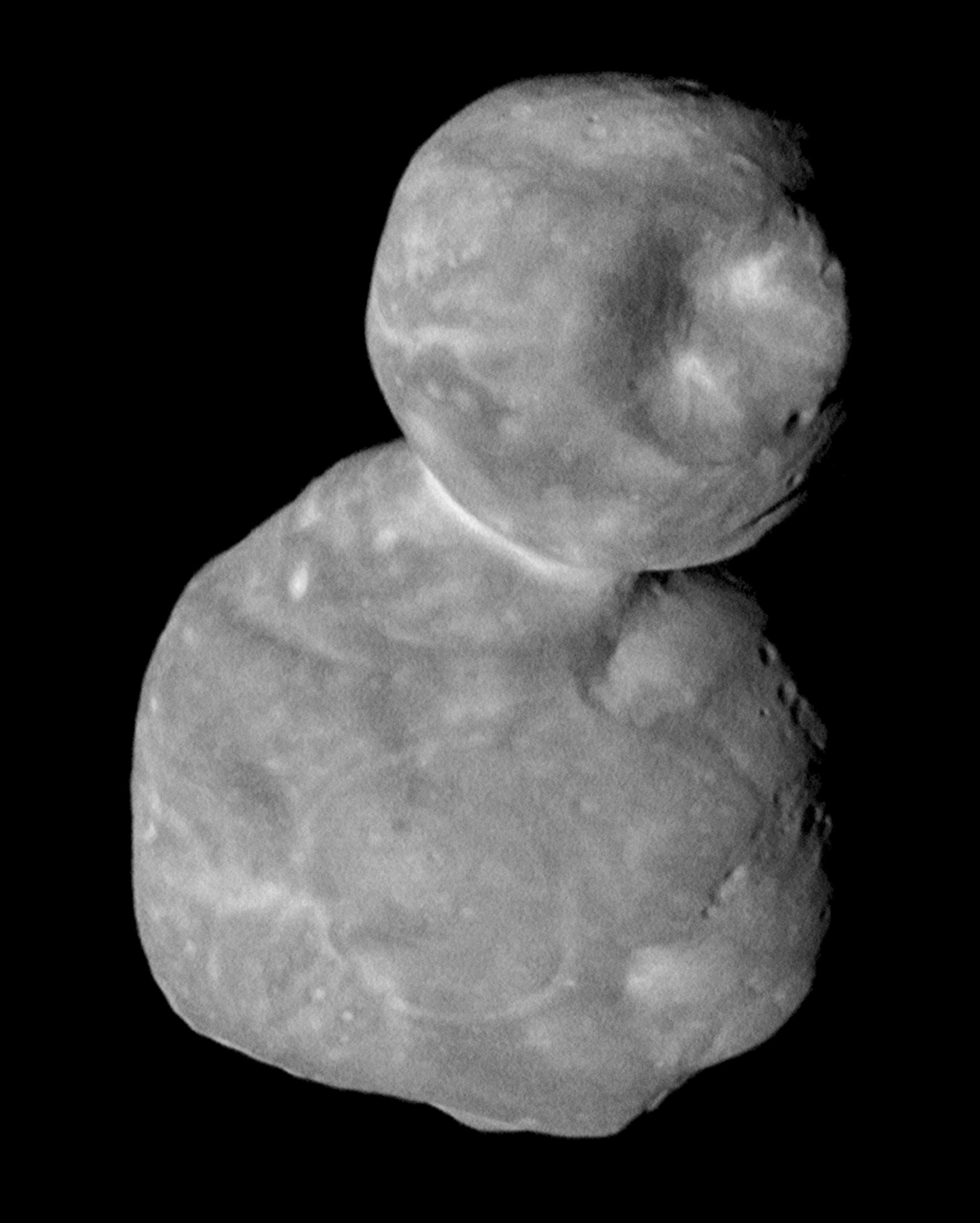
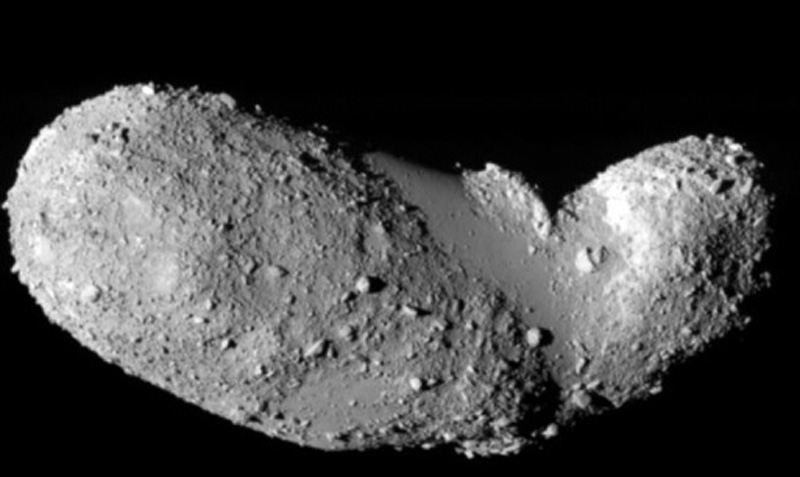
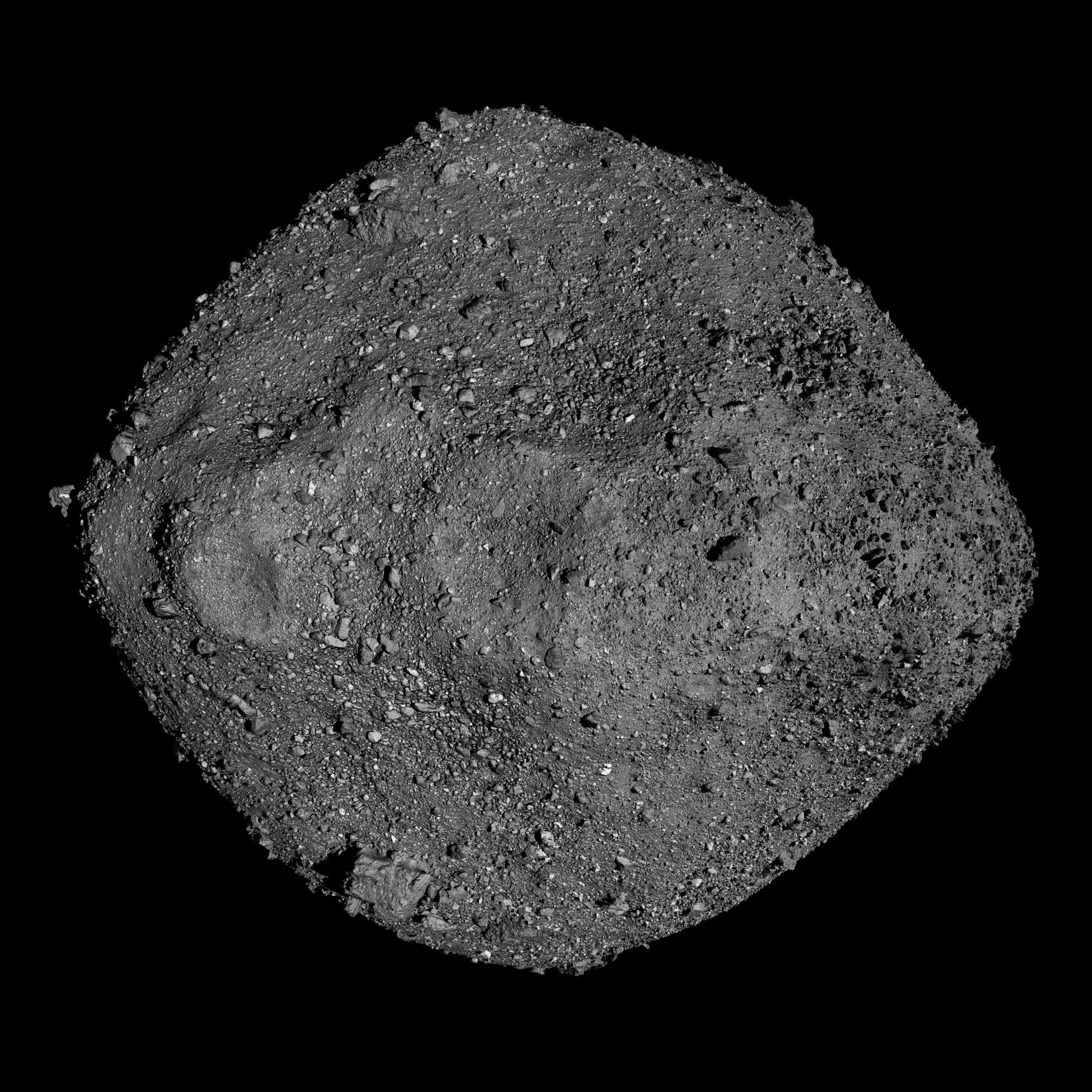
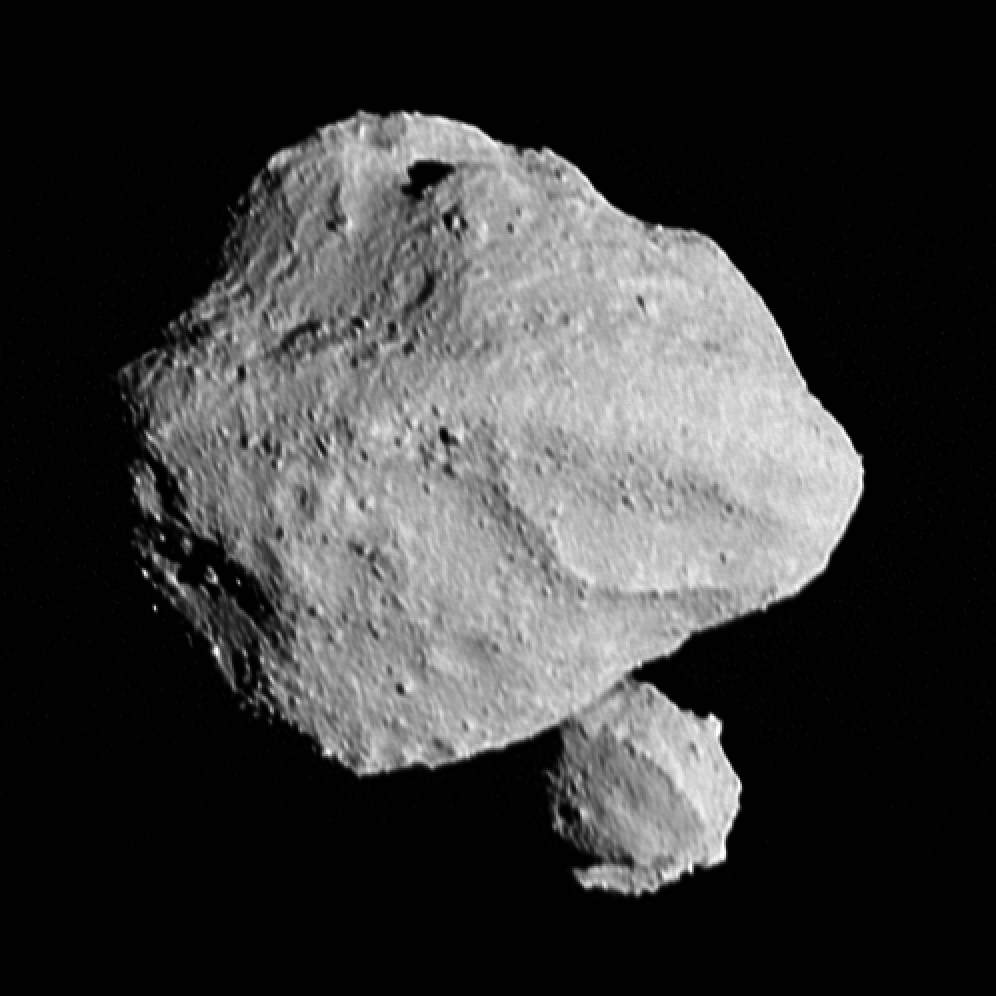
Various visited minor planets and their diversity:
- Pluto and Ceres
- Vesta, Lutetia, and Arrokoth
- Itokawa, Bennu, and Dinkinesh and its satellite Selam
Sizes are not to scale.

A minor planet, according to the International Astronomical Union (IAU), is an astronomical object in direct orbit around the Sun that is exclusively classified as neither a planet nor a comet. Before 2006, the IAU officially used the term minor planet, but that year's meeting reclassified minor planets and comets into small Solar System bodies (SSSBs) and dwarf planets, including into the respective categories comets and Pluto, which were generally not considered minor planets. In contrast to the eight official planets of the Solar System, all minor planets fail to clear their orbital neighborhood.

Minor planets include asteroids (near-Earth objects, Earth trojans, Mars trojans, Mars-crossers, main-belt asteroids and Jupiter trojans), as well as distant minor planets (Uranus trojans, Neptune trojans, centaurs and trans-Neptunian objects), most of which reside in the Kuiper belt and the scattered disc. As of June 2026, there are 1,544,016 known objects, divided into 895,910 numbered (secured discoveries) and 656,913 unnumbered minor planets. Approximately nine of the numbered minor planets are known or suspected to be dwarf planets.

The first minor planet to be discovered was Ceres in 1801, though it was called a 'planet' at the time and an 'asteroid' soon after; the term minor planet was not introduced until 1841, and was considered a subcategory of 'planet' until 1932. The term planetoid has also been used, especially for larger, planetary objects such as those the IAU has called dwarf planets since 2006. Historically, the terms asteroid, minor planet, and planetoid have been more or less synonymous. This terminology has become more complicated by the discovery of numerous minor planets beyond the orbit of Jupiter, especially trans-Neptunian objects that are generally not considered asteroids. A minor planet seen releasing gas may be dually classified as a comet.

Objects are called dwarf planets if their own gravity is sufficient to achieve hydrostatic equilibrium and form an ellipsoidal shape. All other minor planets and comets are called small Solar System bodies. The IAU stated that the term minor planet may still be used, but the term small Solar System body will be preferred. However, for purposes of numbering and naming, the traditional distinction between minor planet and comet is still used.

== Populations ==
Euler diagram showing the types of bodies in the Solar System according to the IAU

Hundreds of thousands of minor planets have been discovered within the Solar System and thousands more are discovered each month. The Minor Planet Center has documented over 213 million observations and 794,832 minor planets, of which 541,128 have orbits known well enough to be assigned permanent official numbers. Of these, 21,922 have official names. As of 16 March 2026, the lowest-numbered unnamed minor planet is (4596) 1981 QB, and the highest-numbered named minor planet is 884759 Compostela.

There are various broad minor-planet populations:

- Asteroids; traditionally, most have been bodies in the inner Solar System.
  - Near-Earth asteroids, those whose orbits take them inside the orbit of Mars. Further subclassification of these, based on orbital distance, is used:
    - Atira asteroids orbit inside of Earth's perihelion distance and thus are contained entirely within the orbit of Earth.
    - Aten asteroids, those that have a semimajor axis less than Earth's and an aphelion (furthest distance from the Sun) greater than 0.983 AU.
    - Apollo asteroids are those asteroids with a semimajor axis greater than Earth's while having a perihelion distance of 1.017 AU or less. Like Aten asteroids, Apollo asteroids are Earth-crossers.
    - Amor asteroids are those near-Earth asteroids that approach the orbit of Earth from beyond but do not cross it. Amor asteroids are further subdivided into four subgroups, depending on where their semimajor axis falls between Earth's orbit and the asteroid belt.
  - Earth trojans, asteroids sharing Earth's orbit and gravitationally locked to it. As of 2022, two Earth trojans are known: 2010 TK_{7} and 2020 XL_{5}.
  - Mars trojans, asteroids sharing Mars's orbit and gravitationally locked to it. As of 2007, eight such asteroids are known.
  - Asteroid belt, whose members follow roughly circular orbits between Mars and Jupiter. These are the original and best-known group of asteroids.
  - Jupiter trojans, asteroids sharing Jupiter's orbit and gravitationally locked to it. Numerically they are estimated to equal the main-belt asteroids.
- Distant minor planets, an umbrella term for minor planets in the outer Solar System.
  - Centaurs, bodies in the outer Solar System between Jupiter and Neptune. They have unstable orbits due to the gravitational influence of the giant planets, and therefore must have come from elsewhere, probably outside Neptune.
  - Neptune trojans, bodies sharing Neptune's orbit and gravitationally locked to it. Although only a handful are known, there is evidence that Neptune trojans are more numerous than either the asteroids in the asteroid belt or the Jupiter trojans.
  - Trans-Neptunian objects, bodies at or beyond the orbit of Neptune, the outermost planet.
    - The Kuiper belt, objects inside an apparent population drop-off approximately 55 AU from the Sun.
      - Classical Kuiper belt objects like Makemake, also known as cubewanos, are in primordial, relatively circular orbits that are not in resonance with Neptune.
      - Resonant Kuiper belt objects.
        - Plutinos, bodies like Pluto that are in a 2:3 resonance with Neptune.
    - Scattered disc objects like Eris, with aphelia outside the Kuiper belt. These are thought to have been scattered by Neptune.
      - Resonant scattered disc objects.
    - Detached objects such as Sedna, with both an aphelion and a perihelion outside the Kuiper belt.
      - Sednoids, detached objects with a perihelion greater than 75 AU (Sedna, 2012 VP113, and Leleākūhonua).
    - The Oort cloud, a hypothetical population thought to be the source of long-period comets and that may extend to 50,000 AU from the Sun.

== Naming conventions ==
Out of a total of more than 700,000 discovered minor planets, 66% have been numbered (green) and 34% remain unnumbered (red). Only a small fraction of 20,071 minor planets (3%) have been named (purple).

All astronomical bodies in the Solar System need a distinct designation. The naming of minor planets runs through a three-step process. First, a provisional designation is given upon discovery—because the object still may turn out to be a false positive or become lost later on—called a provisionally designated minor planet. After the observation arc is accurate enough to predict its future location, a minor planet is formally designated and receives a number. It is then a numbered minor planet. Finally, in the third step, it may be named by its discoverers. However, only a small fraction of all minor planets have been named. The vast majority are either numbered or have still only a provisional designation. Example of the naming process:

- 1932 HA – provisional designation upon discovery on 24 April 1932
- (1862) 1932 HA – formal designation, receives an official number
- 1862 Apollo – named minor planet, receives a name, the alphanumeric code is dropped

=== Provisional designation ===
A newly discovered minor planet is given a provisional designation. For example, the provisional designation 2002 AT4 consists of the year of discovery (2002) and an alphanumeric code indicating the half-month of discovery and the sequence within that half-month. Once an asteroid's orbit has been confirmed, it is given a number, and later may also be given a name (e.g. 433 Eros). The formal naming convention uses parentheses around the number, but dropping the parentheses is quite common. Informally, it is common to drop the number altogether or to drop it after the first mention when a name is repeated in running text.

Minor planets that have been given a number but not a name keep their provisional designation, e.g. (29075) 1950 DA. Because modern discovery techniques are finding vast numbers of new asteroids, they are increasingly being left unnamed. The earliest discovered to be left unnamed was for a long time (3360) 1981 VA, now 3360 Syrinx. In November 2006 its position as the lowest-numbered unnamed asteroid passed to (3708) 1974 FV1 (now 3708 Socus), and in May 2021 to (4596) 1981 QB. On rare occasions, a small object's provisional designation may become used as a name in itself: the then-unnamed (15760) 1992 QB_{1} gave its "name" to a group of objects that became known as classical Kuiper belt objects ("cubewanos") before it was finally named Albion in January 2018.

A few objects are cross-listed as both comets and asteroids, such as 4015 Wilson–Harrington, which is also listed as 107P/Wilson–Harrington.

=== Numbering ===
Minor planets are awarded an official number once their orbits are confirmed. With the increasing rapidity of discovery, these are now six-figure numbers. The switch from five figures to six figures arrived with the publication of the Minor Planet Circular (MPC) of October 19, 2005, which saw the highest-numbered minor planet jump from 99947 to 118161.

=== Naming ===
The first few asteroids were named after figures from Greek and Roman mythology, but as such names started to dwindle the names of famous people, literary characters, discoverers' spouses, children, colleagues, and even television characters were used.

==== Gender ====
The first asteroid to be given a non-mythological name was 20 Massalia, named after the Greek name for the city of Marseille. The first to be given an entirely non-Classical name was 45 Eugenia, named after Empress Eugénie de Montijo, the wife of Napoleon III. For some time only female (or feminized) names were used; Alexander von Humboldt was the first man to have an asteroid named after him, but his name was feminized to 54 Alexandra. This unspoken tradition lasted until 334 Chicago was named; even then, female names showed up in the list for years after.

==== Eccentric ====
As the number of asteroids began to run into the hundreds, and eventually, in the thousands, discoverers began to give them increasingly frivolous names. The first hints of this were 482 Petrina and 483 Seppina, named after the discoverer's pet dogs. However, there was little controversy about this until 1971, upon the naming of 2309 Mr. Spock (the name of the discoverer's cat). Although the IAU subsequently discouraged the use of pet names as sources, eccentric asteroid names are still being proposed and accepted, such as 4321 Zero, 6042 Cheshirecat, 9007 James Bond, 13579 Allodd and 24680 Alleven, and 26858 Misterrogers.

==== Discoverer's name ====
A well-established rule is that, unlike comets, minor planets may not be named after their discoverer(s). One way to circumvent this rule has been for astronomers to exchange the courtesy of naming their discoveries after each other. Rare exceptions to this rule are 1927 Suvanto and 96747 Crespodasilva. 1927 Suvanto was named after its discoverer, Rafael Suvanto, posthumously by the Minor Planet Center. He died four years after the discovery in the last days of the Finnish Winter War of 1939–40. 96747 Crespodasilva was named after its discoverer, Lucy d'Escoffier Crespo da Silva, because she died shortly after the discovery, at age 22.

==== Languages ====
Names were adapted to various languages from the beginning. 1 Ceres, Ceres being its Anglo-Latin name, was actually named Cerere, the Italian form of the name. German, French, Arabic, and Hindi use forms similar to the English, whereas Russian uses a form, Tserera, similar to the Italian. In Greek, the name was translated to Δήμητρα (Demeter), the Greek equivalent of the Roman goddess Ceres. In the early years, before it started causing conflicts, asteroids named after Roman figures were generally translated in Greek; other examples are Ἥρα (Hera) for 3 Juno, Ἑστία (Hestia) for 4 Vesta, Χλωρίς (Chloris) for 8 Flora, and Πίστη (Pistis) for 37 Fides. In Chinese, the names are not given the Chinese forms of the deities they are named after, but rather typically have a syllable or two for the character of the deity or person, followed by 神 'god(dess)' or 女 'woman' if just one syllable, plus 星 'star/planet', so that most asteroid names are written with three Chinese characters. Thus Ceres is 穀神星 'grain goddess planet', Pallas is 智神星 'wisdom goddess planet', etc.

== Physical properties of comets and minor planets ==
Commission 15 of the International Astronomical Union is dedicated to the Physical Study of Comets & Minor Planets.

Archival data on the physical properties of comets and minor planets are found in the PDS Asteroid/Dust Archive. This includes standard asteroid physical characteristics such as the properties of binary systems, occultation timings and diameters, masses, densities, rotation periods, surface temperatures, albedoes, spin vectors, taxonomy, and absolute magnitudes and slopes. In addition, European Asteroid Research Node (E.A.R.N.), an association of asteroid research groups, maintains a Data Base of Physical and Dynamical Properties of Near Earth Asteroids.

== Environmental properties ==
Environmental characteristics have three aspects: space environment, surface environment and internal environment, including geological, optical, thermal and radiological environmental properties, etc., which are the basis for understanding the basic properties of minor planets, carrying out scientific research, and are also an important reference basis for designing the payload of exploration missions.

=== Radiation environment ===
Without the protection of an atmosphere and its own strong magnetic field, the minor planet's surface is directly exposed to the surrounding radiation environment. In the cosmic space where minor planets are located, the radiation on the surface of the planets can be divided into two categories according to their sources: one comes from the sun, including electromagnetic radiation from the sun, and ionizing radiation from the solar wind and solar energy particles; the other comes from outside the Solar System, that is, galactic cosmic rays, etc.

=== Optical environment ===
Usually during one rotation period of a minor planet, the albedo of a minor planet will change slightly due to its irregular shape and uneven distribution of material composition. This small change will be reflected in the periodic change of the planet's light curve, which can be observed by ground-based equipment, so as to obtain the planet's magnitude, rotation period, rotation axis orientation, shape, albedo distribution, and scattering properties. Generally speaking, the albedo of minor planets is usually low, and the overall statistical distribution is bimodal, corresponding to C-type (average 0.035) and S-type (average 0.15) minor planets. In the minor planet exploration mission, measuring the albedo and color changes of the planet surface is also the most basic method to directly know the difference in the material composition of the planet surface.

=== Geological environment ===
The geological environment on the surface of minor planets is similar to that of other unprotected celestial bodies, with the most widespread geomorphological feature present being impact craters: however, the fact that most minor planets are rubble pile structures, which are loose and porous, gives the impact action on the surface of minor planets its unique characteristics. On highly porous minor planets, small impact events produce spatter blankets similar to common impact events: whereas large impact events are dominated by compaction and spatter blankets are difficult to form, and the longer the planets receive such large impacts, the greater the overall density. In addition, statistical analysis of impact craters is an important means of obtaining information on the age of a planet surface. Although the Crater Size-Frequency Distribution (CSFD) method of dating commonly used on minor planet surfaces does not allow absolute ages to be obtained, it can be used to determine the relative ages of different geological bodies for comparison. In addition to impact, there are a variety of other rich geological effects on the surface of minor planets, such as mass wasting on slopes and impact crater walls, large-scale linear features associated with graben, and electrostatic transport of dust. By analysing the various geological processes on the surface of minor planets, it is possible to learn about the possible internal activity at this stage and some of the key evolutionary information about the long-term interaction with the external environment, which may lead to some indication of the nature of the parent body's origin. Many of the larger planets are often covered by a layer of soil (regolith) of unknown thickness. Compared to other atmosphere-free bodies in the Solar System (e.g. the Moon), minor planets have weaker gravity fields and are less capable of retaining fine-grained material, resulting in a somewhat larger surface soil layer size. Soil layers are inevitably subject to intense space weathering that alters their physical and chemical properties due to direct exposure to the surrounding space environment. In silicate-rich soils, the outer layers of Fe are reduced to nano-phase Fe (np-Fe), which is the main product of space weathering. For some small planets, their surfaces are more exposed as boulders of varying sizes, up to 100 metres in diameter, due to their weaker gravitational pull. These boulders are of high scientific interest, as they may be either deeply buried material excavated by impact action or fragments of the planet's parent body that have survived. The rocks provide more direct and primitive information about the material inside the minor planet and the nature of its parent body than the soil layer, and the different colours and forms of the rocks indicate different sources of material on the surface of the minor planet or different evolutionary processes.

=== Magnetic environment ===
Usually in the interior of the planet, the convection of the conductive fluid will generate a large and strong magnetic field. However, the size of a minor planet is generally small and most of the minor planets have a "crushed stone pile" structure, and there is basically no "dynamo" structure inside, so it will not generate a self-generated dipole magnetic field like the Earth. But some minor planets do have magnetic fields—on the one hand, some minor planets have remanent magnetism: if the parent body had a magnetic field or if the nearby planetary body has a strong magnetic field, the rocks on the parent body will be magnetised during the cooling process and the planet formed by the fission of the parent body will still retain remanence, which can also be detected in extraterrestrial meteorites from the minor planets; on the other hand, if the minor planets are composed of electrically conductive material and their internal conductivity is similar to that of carbon- or iron-bearing meteorites, the interaction between the minor planets and the solar wind is likely to be unipolar induction, resulting in an external magnetic field for the minor planet. In addition, the magnetic fields of minor planets are not static; impact events, weathering in space and changes in the thermal environment can alter the existing magnetic fields of minor planets. At present, there are not many direct observations of minor planet magnetic fields, and the few existing planets detection projects generally carry magnetometers, with some targets such as Gaspra and Braille measured to have strong magnetic fields nearby, while others such as Lutetia have no magnetic field.

== See also ==
- Groups of minor planets
- List of minor planets
- Dwarf planet
- Quasi-satellite
- Small Solar System body
- List of minor planets and comets visited by spacecraft
