= 2022 in Mauritius =

- Years in Mauritius: 2019 2020 2021 2022 2023 2024 2025
- Centuries: 20th century · 21st century · 22nd century
- Decades: 1990s 2000s 2010s 2020s 2030s 2040s 2050s
- Years: 2019 2020 2021 2022 2023 2024 2025

Events in the year 2022 in Mauritius.

== Incumbents ==
- President: Prithvirajsing Roopun
- Prime Minister: Pravind Jugnauth

== Events ==
Ongoing — COVID-19 pandemic in Mauritius

- 14 February – The flag of Mauritius is raised on the British-controlled Chagos Archipelago in the Indian Ocean for the first time in history. Mauritian Prime Minister Pravind Jugnauth describes the event as a "historic moment", saying that it was time for the United Kingdom to cede control of the archipelago.

== Sports ==
- 28 July – 8 August: Mauritius at the 2022 Commonwealth Games
- 7 – 17 July: Mauritius at the 2022 World Games

== Deaths ==
=== January ===
- 18 January – Guillaume Domingue, 36, radio broadcaster (born 1985)

=== March ===
- 12 March – Karl Offmann, 81, Mauritian politician, president (2002–2003) (born 1940)
