= 2024 in Mauritius =

- Years in Mauritius: 2021 2022 2023 2024 2025 2026 2027
- Centuries: 20th century · 21st century · 22nd century
- Decades: 1990s 2000s 2010s 2020s 2030s 2040s 2050s
- Years: 2021 2022 2023 2024 2025 2026 2027

Events in the year 2024 in Mauritius.

== Incumbents ==
- President: Prithvirajsing Roopun (until 6 December); Dharam Gokhool (6 December onwards)
- Prime Minister: Pravind Jugnauth (until 13 November); Navin Ramgoolam (13 November onwards)

== Events ==
- 15 January: Cyclone Belal hits Mauritius, causing floods.
- 3 October: The United Kingdom agrees to relinquish sovereignty over the Chagos Archipelago to Mauritius in exchange for the UK and the United States retaining control over their joint military base in Diego Garcia.
- 1 November: The government blocks access to social media until 11 November, citing issues of public safety and threats to national security. The ban is lifted on 2 November following public uproar.
- 10 November: 2024 Mauritian general election: The ruling Alliance Lepep loses its majority in the National Assembly to the Alliance du Changement by a landslide.
- 15 December: An arrest warrant is issued against former Bank of Mauritius governor Harvesh Kumar Seegolam on fraud charges.

== Deaths ==
- 16 November: Joseph Tsang Mang Kin, 86, poet, political scientist, and biographer.
