= 2023 in Mauritius =

- Years in Mauritius: 2020 2021 2022 2023 2024 2025 2026
- Centuries: 20th century · 21st century · 22nd century
- Decades: 1990s 2000s 2010s 2020s 2030s 2040s 2050s
- Years: 2020 2021 2022 2023 2024 2025 2026

Events in the year 2023 in Mauritius.

== Incumbents ==
- President: Prithvirajsing Roopun
- Prime Minister: Pravind Jugnauth

== Deaths ==
- 7 November: Dev Virahsawmy, 81, political activist, founder of Mauritian Militant Movement.
