= 2035 =

Calendar year

2035 in various calendars
- Gregorian calendar: 2035; MMXXXV
- Ab urbe condita: 2788
- Armenian calendar: 1484; ԹՎ ՌՆՁԴ
- Assyrian calendar: 6785
- Baháʼí calendar: 191–192
- Balinese saka calendar: 1956–1957
- Bengali calendar: 1441–1442
- Berber calendar: 2985
- British Regnal year: N/A
- Buddhist calendar: 2579
- Burmese calendar: 1397
- Byzantine calendar: 7543–7544
- Chinese calendar: 甲寅年 (Wood Tiger); 4732 or 4525 — to — 乙卯年 (Wood Rabbit); 4733 or 4526
- Coptic calendar: 1751–1752
- Discordian calendar: 3201
- Ethiopian calendar: 2027–2028
- Hebrew calendar: 5795–5796
- Hindu calendars
- Vikram Samvat: 2091–2092
- Shaka Samvat: 1956–1957
- Kali Yuga: 5135–5136
- Holocene calendar: 12035
- Igbo calendar: 1035–1036
- Iranian calendar: 1413–1414
- Islamic calendar: 1456–1457
- Japanese calendar: Reiwa 17 (令和１７年)
- Javanese calendar: 1968–1969
- Juche calendar: 124
- Julian calendar: Gregorian minus 13 days
- Korean calendar: 4368
- Minguo calendar: ROC 124 民國124年
- Nanakshahi calendar: 567
- Thai solar calendar: 2578
- Tibetan calendar: ཤིང་ཕོ་སྟག་ལོ་ (male Wood-Tiger); 2161 or 1780 or 1008 — to — ཤིང་མོ་ཡོས་ལོ་ (female Wood-Hare); 2162 or 1781 or 1009
- Unix time: 2051222400 – 2082758399

2035 (MMXXXV) will be a common year starting on Monday of the Gregorian calendar, the 2035th year of the Common Era (CE) and Anno Domini (AD) designations, the 35th year of the 3rd millennium and the 21st century, and the 6th year of the 2030s decade.

== Predicted and scheduled events ==
=== Date unknown ===
- According to the Pew Research Center, Islam is projected to overtake Christianity by 2035 as the world's largest religion.
- A fully fault-tolerant quantum computer is expected.
- New petrol and diesel cars will be banned from sale in the United Kingdom and European Union.
- ITER is expected to achieve full fusion in 2035.
- The 2035 FIFA Women's World Cup will be held in the United Kingdom.
- All regions of the Lower Volga, southern Western Siberia and part of the Far East will experience a shortage of water resources for agriculture.
- End of the project Pakistan Vision 2035, the successor to Pakistan Vision 2025 aimed at attaining regional and global leadership in its target sectors.
