= 2021 in Mauritius =

- Years in Mauritius: 2018 2019 2020 2021 2022 2023 2024
- Centuries: 20th century · 21st century · 22nd century
- Decades: 1990s 2000s 2010s 2020s 2030s 2040s 2050s
- Years: 2018 2019 2020 2021 2022 2023 2024

Events in the year 2021 in Mauritius.

== Incumbents ==
- President: Prithvirajsing Roopun
- Prime Minister: Pravind Jugnauth

== Events ==
Ongoing — COVID-19 pandemic in Mauritius

== Deaths ==
=== April ===
- 10 April – Édouard Maunick, 89, poet (born 1931).

=== June ===
- 3 June – Sir Anerood Jugnauth, 2nd Prime Minister and 4th President of Mauritius (b. 1930)
