= As Long As Possible =

2015 artwork by Juha van Ingen

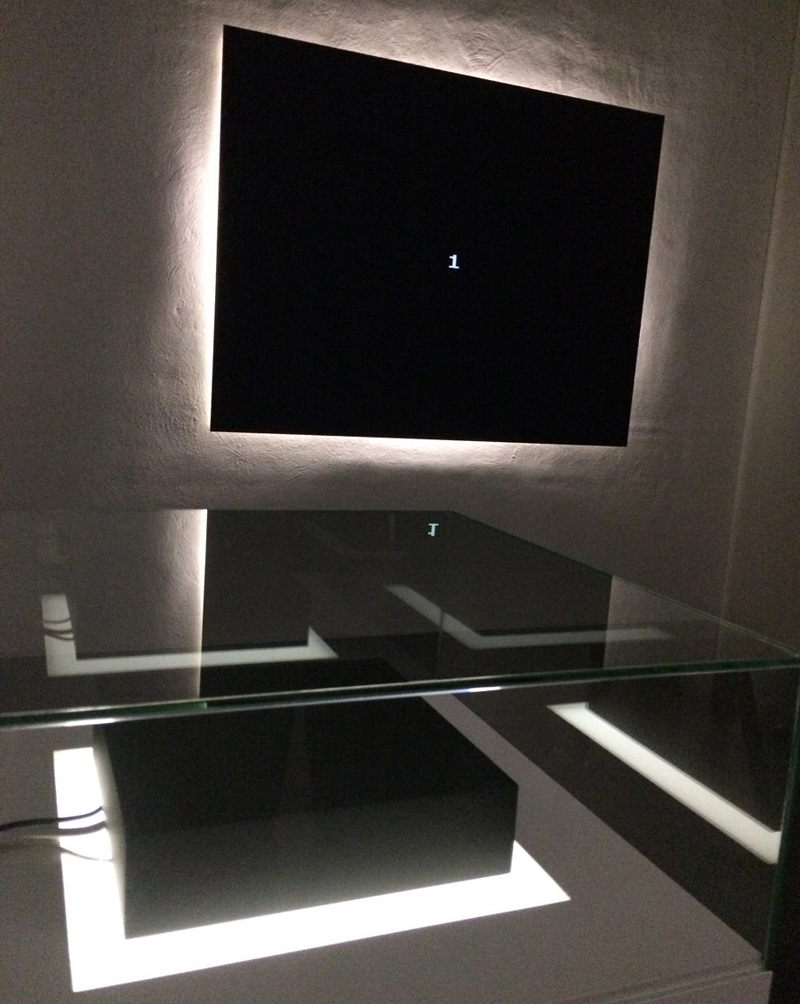
Juha van Ingen, As Long As Possible, first frame playing documented in KIASMA Helsinki 2017

As Long As Possible (ASLAP) (2015–2017) is a 1,000-year long animated GIF made by Finnish artist Juha van Ingen. It premiered at Kiasma National Museum of Contemporary Art in Helsinki on 28 March 2017. The animation is created in collaboration with developer and sound artist Janne Särkelä. The GIF started playing in 2017 and is designed to run for 1,000 years, ending in 3017. It has a total of 48,140,288 frames.

== Background ==
ASLAP belongs to a group of art works for which extreme duration is an essential part of the concept, such as:

- Canadian artist Rodney Graham's Parsifal (1882—38,969,364,735), which was based on an addition to Richard Wagner's Parsifal by Engelbert Humperdinck during the first performance thereof. It was initiated in 1990 and in theory is playing for another 39 billion years – three times longer than the estimated age of the Universe.
- Longplayer by Jem Finer (of the Pogues) sounding from the Trinity Buoy lighthouse near Canary Wharf in London.
- The yet to be released 10,000-year Clock of the Long Now by the Long Now Foundation in USA.

== As Long As Possible (ASLAP) ==
The work is developed as a GIF animation, with each frame lasting 655,090 milliseconds, which is approximately 10.92 minutes. The total number of frames is 48,140,288 making the duration of the animation 1000 years. The GIF file contains a loop function which will automatically, after the last frame has played, start the animation all over. ASLAP is intended to continue to play forever.

The animation was developed in 2015, and premiered at Kiasma Museum of Contemporary Art in Helsinki in 2017, coinciding with the 30 year anniversary of the GIF format. ASLAP was presented in the context of ARS 17: "Hello World", a major exhibition of international contemporary art on the theme of postinternet art.

The name of ASLAP is homage to the musical composition ORGAN²/ASLSP (1987) by John Cage which is currently played on the church organ of St. Burchardi church in Halberstadt in Germany since its premiere in 2001, and will continue to play for the next 639 years. The abbreviation of Cage's composition includes an instruction to the performer of the piece on how to perform the work: As Slow As Possible.

== Maintenance of the artwork ==
The ASLAP file is cloned and it will simultaneously run on six physical playback units at different geographical locations. When one unit is destroyed for any reason, or when it needs to be technically upgraded, a new physical unit is built and the animation file is cloned and synchronised with the remaining units. If all of the playback units are destroyed the file is to be reconstructed from special time capsules that contain the description of the artwork, the specifications of the GIF format, the original GIF file and necessary documents including a printed copy of the code for generating a new file.

The first ASLAP play back unit is included in the collection of The Finnish National Gallery and is playing and stored in Helsinki. The Finnish National Gallery has agreed to keep the animation playing until 3017.

The first time capsule was deposited 18 March 2017 into the Kumu Art Museum of Estonia collection and is permanently stored in Tallinn, Estonia.

== Presentation of ASLAP in ARS17 ==
Apart from the projected image of the ASLAP animation, the art work as presented by Kiasma included a player programmed by Jani Lindqvist, a computer, and a stainless steel box to protect the file and equipment through its life time. The installation also contained three digital prints of ASLAP frames and the printed binary code of the ASLAP GIF file, frames 1–40100.
