= 1978 in Mauritius =

- Years in Mauritius: 1975 1976 1977 1978 1979 1980 1981
- Centuries: 19th century · 20th century · 21st century
- Decades: 1940s 1950s 1960s 1970s 1980s 1990s 2000s
- Years: 1975 1976 1977 1978 1979 1980 1981

Events in the year 1978 in Mauritius.

== Governor-General of Mauritius ==
- Sir Henry Garrioch (1977–1979)

== Events ==
- Dr. Regis Chaperon State Secondary School, Quatre Bornes, established

== Births ==
- 20 September - Akash Choolun, Mauritian former international footballer
- 6 October - Westley Laboucherie, Mauritian footballer

== See also ==
- History of Mauritius
