= Matthew Moskowitz =

American abstract painter (born 1976)

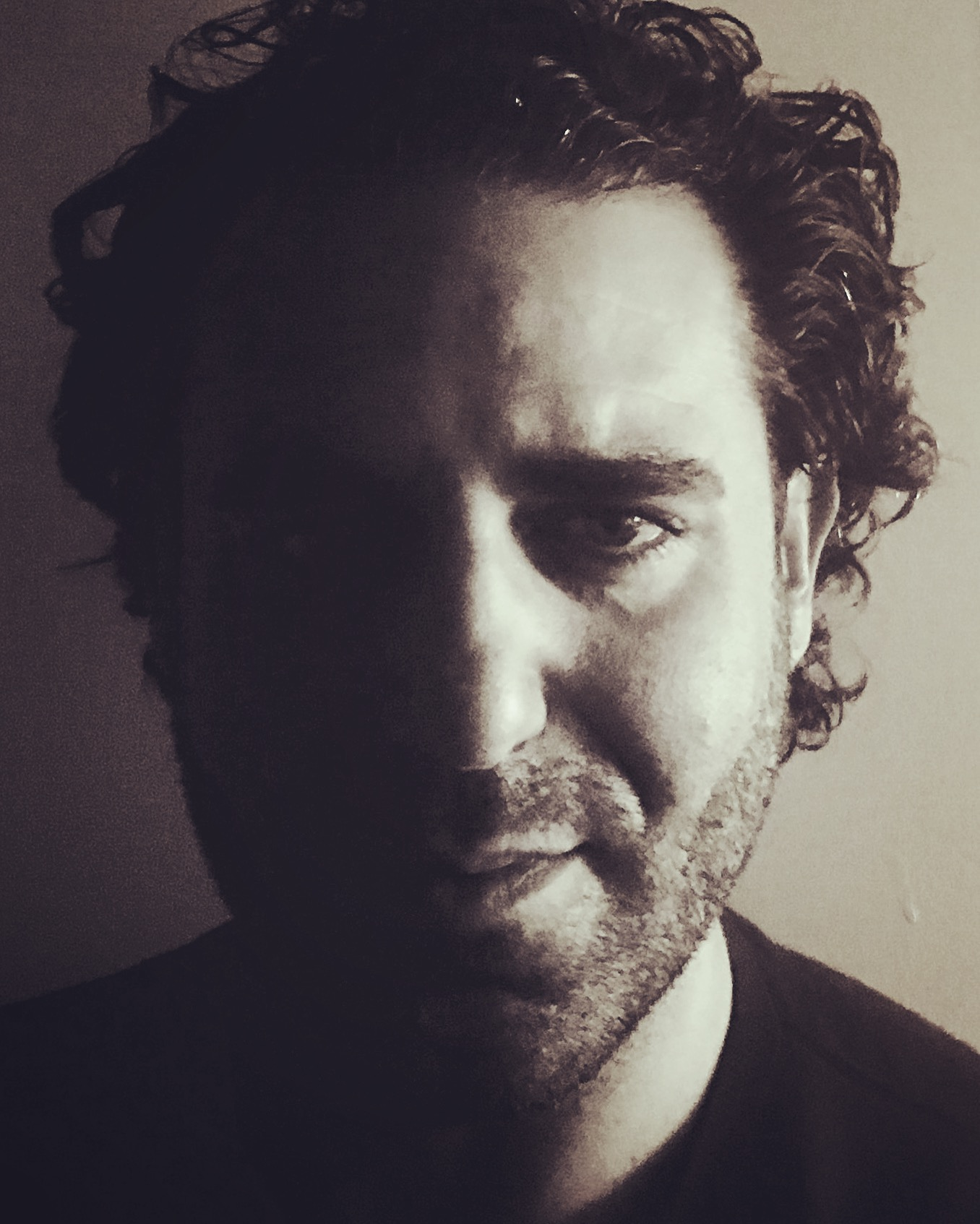
- Born: 1976 (age 49–50)
- Citizenship: American
- Known for: Abstract art

Matthew Moskowitz (born 1976 in the United States) is an American abstract painter who works in New York. In 2012 his paintings were seen in the Museum of Modern Art (MoMA). Moskowitz's show in London England was held in the art district Trinity Buoy Wharf. Moskowitz represented the United States. The title of the show was "Breathe." It was an international event with career artists from several countries. Moskowitz's painting are within both private and corporate art collections. Moskowitz is within the collection of Guild Hall Art Museum in East Hampton, New York. His painting titled "Safari" hung in its 79th Annual Artist Member Exhibition in April 2017. The show is the oldest running exhibition on Long Island.
