= Thirties =

Thirties may refer to:

- 30s
- 1930s
- 2030s
