= 3rd millennium =

Current millennium spanning the years 2001 to 3000

The third millennium of the Anno Domini or Common Era is the current millennium spanning the years 2001 to 3000. It began on January 1, 2001 (MMI) and will end on December 31, 3000 (MMM), (21st to 30th centuries; in astronomy: JD 2451910.5 – 2817151.5).

Ongoing futures studies seek to understand what will likely continue and what could plausibly change in this period and beyond.

== Predictions and forecasts not included on this timeline ==
Prediction or forecast	Reason for exclusion
Apocalyptic events	Redundant to: List of dates predicted for apocalyptic events
Astronomical events	Redundant to: List of future astronomical events, there are also articles for upcoming lunar and solar eclipses in the 21st century.
Calendar events	Redundant to: List of future calendar events
Fictional events	Redundant to: Near future in fiction and List of films set in the future
Near future centennial (bi, tri, etc.) events	These are not included due to arbitrariness and global bias issues.
Population	Redundant to: Human population projections
Second Coming	Redundant to: Predictions and claims for the Second Coming
Time capsules	Redundant to: List of time capsules, there are between 10,000 and 15,000 time capsules worldwide.

== 21st century ==
=== 2000s ===
- See: 2000
- 2001
- 2002
- 2003
- 2004
- 2005
- 2006
- 2007
- 2008
- 2009

=== 2010s ===
- See: 2010
- 2011
- 2012
- 2013
- 2014
- 2015
- 2016
- 2017
- 2018
- 2019

=== 2020s ===
- See: 2020
- 2021
- 2022
- 2023
- 2024
- 2025
- 2026
- 2027
- 2028
- 2029

=== 2030s ===
- See: 2030
- 2031
- 2032
- 2033
- 2034
- 2035
- 2036
- 2037
- 2038
- 2039

=== 2040s ===
- 2040: End year of the Baku City Master Plan implementation.
- 2041:
  - The Antarctic Treaty is scheduled to come under review.
- 2042:
  - 17 September: a common computing representation of date and time on IBM mainframe systems will overflow with potential results similar to the year 2000 problem.
- 2045: On 31 December, Gates Foundation is scheduled to cease operations, as announced by Bill Gates in 2025.
- 2047: On 1 July, the "one country, two systems" principle's guarantee in Hong Kong is scheduled to end, as it was guaranteed for 50 years starting from 1 July 1997, provided under the Hong Kong Basic Law. The agreement was raised by Deng Xiaoping to deal with Hong Kong's reunification with the People's Republic of China in 1997, and stipulated in the Sino-British Joint Declaration of 1984. However, in February 2024, Xia Baolong, the head of the Hong Kong and Macau Affairs Office, said that the system would be kept permanently.
- 2048: On 14 January, the Protocol on Environmental Protection to the Antarctic Treaty is scheduled to come up for review.
- 2049:
  - October 1: Scheduled completion of the Belt and Road Initiative, coinciding with the 100th anniversary of the founding of the People's Republic of China.
  - On 20 December, the "one country, two systems" arrangement with Macau, guaranteed for 50 years starting from 20 December 1999, provided under the Basic Law and the Joint Declaration on the Question of Macau, will expire.

=== 2050s ===
- 2050:
  - The United Kingdom aims to reach net-zero carbon emissions in accordance with the Climate Change Act 2008.
  - Three-North Shelter Forest Program is expected to be completed.
  - Under a plan announced in July 2016, New Zealand aims to eradicate all non-native rats, possums, and mustelids by this year.
  - The case files surrounding the 1943 death of the former lieutenant general of the Polish Army and first Prime Minister of the Polish government in exile, Władysław Sikorski, are expected to be declassified this year by the British government. Due to tensions between the United Kingdom, the Soviet Union, and Nazi Germany, the circumstances of his death has led to disputes over whether the crash was deliberate or not. The official conclusion by the British government is that the crash was accidental. However, the Polish government refused to endorse this report on the basis of a lack of conclusive findings and contradictions within the British evidence. In 2008, an investigation was opened by the Commission for the Prosecution of Crimes against the Polish Nation of the Institute of National Remembrance, and concluded in 2013 that there is not enough evidence to prove or disprove the sabotage theory.
- 2051:
  - April: One of the METI messages Cosmic Call 1 sent from the 70-meter Eupatoria Planetary Radar in 1999 arrives at its destination, the Gliese 777 system.
- 2052:
- 2054:
  - Hawksbill Creek Agreement granting tax exemptions and special economic status for Freeport, Bahamas, is set to expire.

=== 2060s ===
- 2060:
  - The Chinese government aims for China to be carbon neutral.
  - Russia aims to be carbon neutral.
- 2061:
  - 31 December: Expiration of the Singapore-Malaysia Water Agreement.
  - All 6 reactors from the Fukushima Daiichi Nuclear Power Plant are planned to be decommissioned by this time (30 to 40 years from 2021). However, according to a 2023 report by Voice of America, some experts have said "it would be impossible to remove all the melted fuel debris by 2051 and would take 50–100 years, if achieved at all".
- 2065:
  - The process of cleanup and decommissioning the Chernobyl Nuclear Power Plant, following the 1986 Chernobyl disaster, is projected to be finished.
- 2067:
  - In October, the METI message Cosmic Call 1, sent from the 70-meter Eupatoria Planetary Radar, arrives at its destination, the star HD 178428.

=== 2070s ===
- 2070: According to an announcement made by Indian prime minister Narendra Modi in 2021, India will be carbon neutral.
- 2079: For computer software using unsigned 16-bit binary day counts and an epoch of 1 January 1900, the counts will overflow after 65,536 (2^{16}) days, which will occur on 6 June 2079.

=== 2080s ===
- 2085: The "secret" letter of Queen Elizabeth II will be opened in Sydney, Australia.
- 2089: During the months of May and June, insect Magicicada broods X (17-year) and XIX (13-year) will emerge simultaneously. This will be the first time this will occur since 1868; next time will be in 2310. This event occurs only once in every 221 years.

=== 2090s ===
- 2090: The September 11th Victim Compensation Fund is set to expire.
- c. 2092: Work on cleaning up the site of the Oldbury Nuclear Power Station (Note: The Oldbury Nuclear Power Station is located in South Gloucestershire, England.) is scheduled to be complete.
- 2099:
  - The 99-year lease for Kaufman Astoria Studios in Queens, New York City is set to expire.
  - Ontario regains control of the Ontario Highway 407 when its 99-year lease expires.

== 22nd century ==
=== 2100s ===
- 2100:
  - Silverstein Properties' 99-year lease on the World Trade Center expires.
- 2103: Per an agreement between the National Archives and Caroline Kennedy, the jacket Jackie Kennedy wore on the day John F. Kennedy was assassinated cannot be displayed in public until this year.
- 2108: FAT file systems theoretically support dates up to 31 December 2107 (though officially only up to 31 December 2099). See Year 2108 problem.

=== 2110s ===
- The Chernobyl New Safe Confinement reaches end of designed lifetime in the 2110s.
- 2111: The will of Prince Philip, Duke of Edinburgh is scheduled to become public knowledge.
- 2112: The will of Queen Elizabeth II is scheduled to become public knowledge.
- 2115:
  - The first book from Future Library will be published, 100 years after being submitted by author Margaret Atwood.
  - The One Hundred Year Study on Artificial Intelligence (AI100) initiated by Stanford University will be concluded.
  - 100 Years, a film by Robert Rodriguez and John Malkovich, will be released on November 18; 100 years after its development.
- 2116: China Merchants Port's 99-year lease on Hambantota International Port in Sri Lanka is set to expire.
- 2117: In relation to the 2115 release of the 100 Years short film, a song titled "100 Years", composed by Pharrell Williams, will be released to the public. The song was performed by Williams at a private party in Shanghai, China, in 2017. The song is said to have addressed global warming.

=== 2140s ===
- c. 2140: All of the roughly 21 million Bitcoins are expected to be mined.

=== 2150s ===
- 2155: The year type in MySQL supports dates up to 31 December 2155.
- c. 2158: Per the prediction of Francis Eugene Nipher, horses will reach their maximum speed that they can trot, that being able to travel a mile in 99 seconds.

=== 2170s ===
- 2178: On 23 March, Pluto will have completed its first full orbit since its discovery in 1930.

=== 2180s ===
- 2182: On 24 September, asteroid 101955 Bennu has a 1-in-2,700 chance of impacting Earth.
- 2186: On 16 July, the longest total solar eclipse between 4000 BCE and 6000 CE occurs, with totality visible for seven minutes and 29 seconds at its peak in the Atlantic Ocean north of Brazil.

=== 2190s ===
- c. 2198: The Vanguard I satellite, launched in 1958, is expected to re-enter the atmosphere and burn up due to orbital decay assuming it is not retrieved or collides with another object.

== 23rd century ==
- 2206: For the first time since 1935, Earth will experience the maximum number of five solar eclipses in one year.
- 2227–2247: Pluto will be closer to the Sun than Neptune for the first time since 1999.
- c. 2265: Return of the Great Comet of 1861.

== 24th century ==
- 2333: It is projected that the Dounreay nuclear site will be safe to use for other purposes.

== 25th century ==
- 2425: The annual funding increase of $325 per student to Wisconsin public schools, which began in 2023, is set to end.
- c. 2439: The "Across the Universe" message broadcast by NASA in 2008 will reach Polaris.

== 26th century ==
- c. 2500: Climate projections predict a barren landscape for the Amazon rainforest amid low water levels due to vegetation decline.
- c. 2531: Professor Hiroshi Yoshida of Tohoku University conducted a study in 2024 which suggests every Japanese person will have the surname "Satō" if a law requiring couples to share a single surname is not changed before this time.

== 27th century ==
- 2640: On 5 September, the 639-year-long performance of John Cage's organ work As Slow as Possible (begun in 2001) is scheduled to finish at the St. Burchardi Church in Halberstadt, Germany.

== 29th century ==
- 2847: The St. Michael's Catholic Cemetery (Happy Valley) in Hong Kong lease on Wan Chai's Saint Fulan gentleman street will end after a 999-year lease, assuming no legal status changes before that date.

== 30th century ==
- 2951: The Los Angeles Bicentennial Time Capsule in Pershing Square underground garage is scheduled to be opened.
- 2957: The MIT High-Tech Time Capsule is scheduled to be opened.
- c. 2965: The SNAP-10A nuclear satellite, launched in 1965 into an orbit 700 km (430 mi) above Earth, is expected to return to Earth's surface.
- 2991: Venus will occult Neptune.
- 2999:
  - The Longplayer composition is planned to finish on 31 December 2999, marking the end of the thousand-year piece of music.
  - The time capsule in Chinook Centre in Calgary, Alberta, Canada is scheduled to be opened on 31 December 2999 after being sealed in 1999.
- 3000:
  - The Millennium Vault in Guildford, England is scheduled to be opened.
  - The New York Times Time Capsule at the American Museum of Natural History is scheduled to be opened.

== See also ==
- Timelines of the future
- Anthropocene
- Foresight (psychology)
- Outline of futures studies
- Technology forecasting
