= Rainer O. Neugebauer =

German educationalist and historian

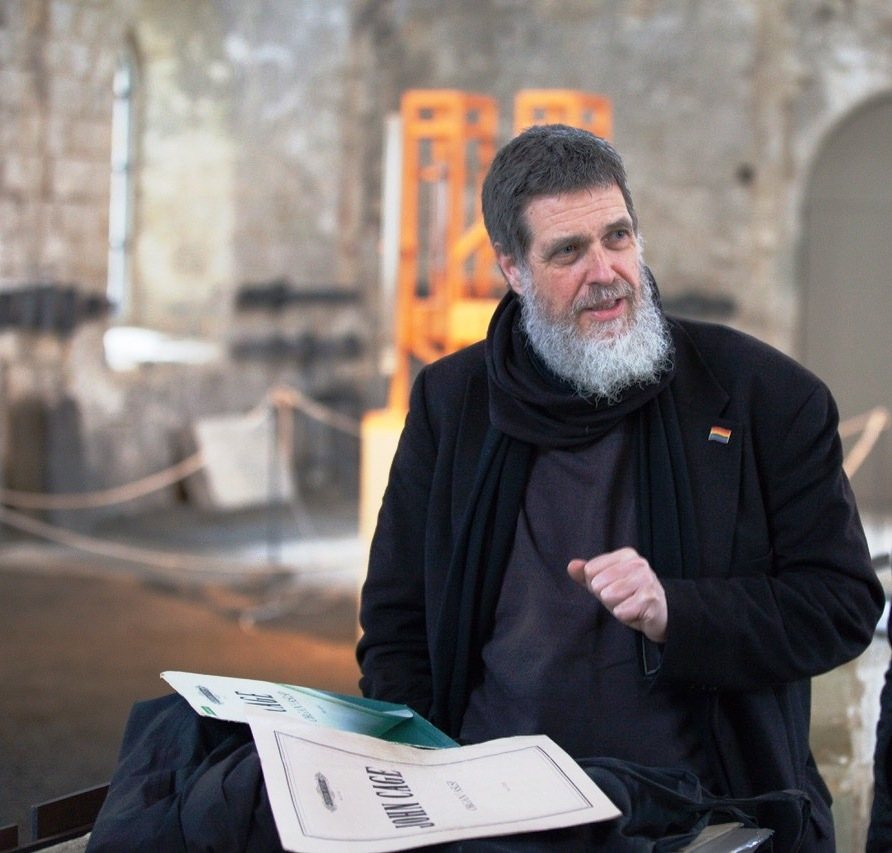
Neugebauer in 2017

Rainer O. Neugebauer (born 16 January 1954) is a German educationalist, historian and social scientist.

== Life ==
Neugebauer was born on 16 January 1954 in Wilhelmshaven, West Germany. He obtained his doctorate from the University of Bonn under Annette Kuhn, worked as a postman, scientific assistant, educator in a kindergarten, in youth media protection, and as a lecturer for political education at a school for conscientious objectors. From 1992 to 1997, he was professor of political science at the Federal University of Applied Administrative Sciences in Cologne and Brühl. Since 1997 he has taught as a professor of social sciences at the Harz University of Applied Studies in Halberstadt and was the founding dean of the Department of Public Management there, since 2019 as professor emeritus. He is engaged in politics and culture. Among other things, Neugebauer is senior curator of the John Cage Organ Foundation Halberstadt, which realizes the piece ORGAN²/ASLSP by John Cage over 639 years, and he was long-time chairman of the board of trustees and artistic director there. Favorite occupation: bookworming. He is married to sign language linguist Martje Hansen.

== Selected works ==
- Alltagsleben. Zur Kritik einer politisch-historischen und didaktischen Kategorie, Frankfurt/M. 1978, ISBN 978-3-88129-153-8
- Identität und historisch-politisches Bewusstsein. Am Beispiel des Arbeiterjugendwiderstandes gegen den Faschismus, Frankfurt/M. 1982, ISBN 978-3-88129-589-5
- (mit Matthias Rösener): Studierende und Gesellschaft. Rechtsextremismus und Fremdenfeindlichkeit unter Studierenden an deutschen Hochschulen, Halberstadt/Wernigerode 2002, ISSN 1619-7232
- (mit Martje Hansen): Europäisches Verwaltungsmanagement und European Mainstreaming, in: Angela Kolb (Hrsg.): New Governance – Europa gut verwaltet/n?, Baden-Baden 2003, ISBN 978-3-789083-59-4
- Von Zeit zu Zeit les' ich den Alten gern ..., in: Rudi Schweikert (Hrsg.): „Da war ich hin und weg“. Arno Schmidt als prägendes Leseerlebnis, Wiesenbach 2004 u. ²2004, ISBN 978-3-924147-55-6
- Konjunkturen der Zivilgesellschaft, Bundeszentrale für politische Bildung (www.bpb.de), Bonn 2007
- Das ganz Andere. Cage in Halberstadt – 6. Klangwechsel, in: Positionen. Texte zur aktuellen Musik, Nr. 76, August 2008, ISSN 0941-4711
- Offener Klangraum für Jahrhunderte, in: Mitteldeutsches Jahrbuch für Kultur und Geschichte, Band 18, Bonn 2011, ISBN 978-3-86795-053-4
- Zeit-lose Klänge, still im Raum, in: Eulenfisch. Limburger Magazin für Religion und Bildung Heft 2_13, Limburg/Lahn 2013, ISSN 1866-0851
- Rede bei der Gedenkveranstaltung des Deutschen Gewerkschaftsbundes am 8. Mai 2015 in der KZ-Gedenkstätte Langenstein Zwieberge, in: Volksbund Forum, 70 Jahre Ende des Zweiten Weltkrieges. Ausgewählte Gedenkreden zum 8. Mai 1945 (Volksbund Forum Nr. 17), Kassel 2015, ISBN 978-3-9817711-0-7
- The eye of man hath not heard, the eare of man hath not seen ... A dream so strangely set in motion, pdf, in: Studiohefte 28, Sabine Groschup (JC{639}) ½ Edition etc., Innsbruck 2016, ISBN 978-3-900083-63-2
- Eine Handvoll Töne, aus│ge│halten, in: art value. positionen zum wert der kunst. Große Kunst, Nr. 19, 11. Jg., Berlin 2017, ISSN 1864-5194
- Sú témy, na ktoré nesmieme myslieť. (Interview with Eva Vozárová and Fero Király), pdf, in: VLNA - urbánny splietací mág, #89 SK Scéna, Bratislava decembra 2021, ISSN 1335-5341, (in Slovak)
- Ein Klang│T│raum verstofflicht. Auf der Leinwand und weitergestickt, in: Sabine Groschup, Der doppelte (T)Raum, Augsburg/Munich 2023, p. 102ff., ISBN 978-3-422-99564-2

== Selected lectures & interviews ==
- (JC{639}), a film by Sabine Groschup 2006/2012
- Slow concert plays first ten years, Euronews, 25 November 2011
- A Visit to John Cage's 639-Year Organ Composition. Examining the expanse of time at one of the world's slowest performances, Red Bull Music Academy Daily, 12 April 2019
- The 639 Year Concert, arte TV, 23 October 2019
- The Longest Song, Newstalk Radio Dublin, The Moncrieff Show, 11 September 2020
- Eternity in the air, Felix. The student newspaper of Imperial College London, Issue 1751, 16 September 2020
- Meet John Cage, the Innovative Composer Behind the 639-year-long Concert, HowStuffWorks, 27 October 2020
- Cage Conversation with Richard T. Eldridge, NAMM Show Believe in Music Week, January 2021
- How Slow Is Slow?, FutureStops. A project of the Royal Canadian College of Organists Podcast Episode 02, 23 September 2021
- The John Cage Organ Project & the Climate Change, Interview with Warren Senders, Music 4 Climate Justice at 2021 United Nations Climate Change Conference in Glasgow 12 November 2021
- The longest, slowest organ music ever, Interview with Bianca Hillier, The World (radio program), 4 January 2023
- A 639-year-long John Cage organ performance strikes a new chord in Germany, Interview with Rob Schmitz, NPR, 6 February 2024
- Listen to the unique sound, Lecture at the 1st International LTAP Conference in Halberstadt, 31 August 2024
