= As Slow as Possible =

Musical composition by John Cage

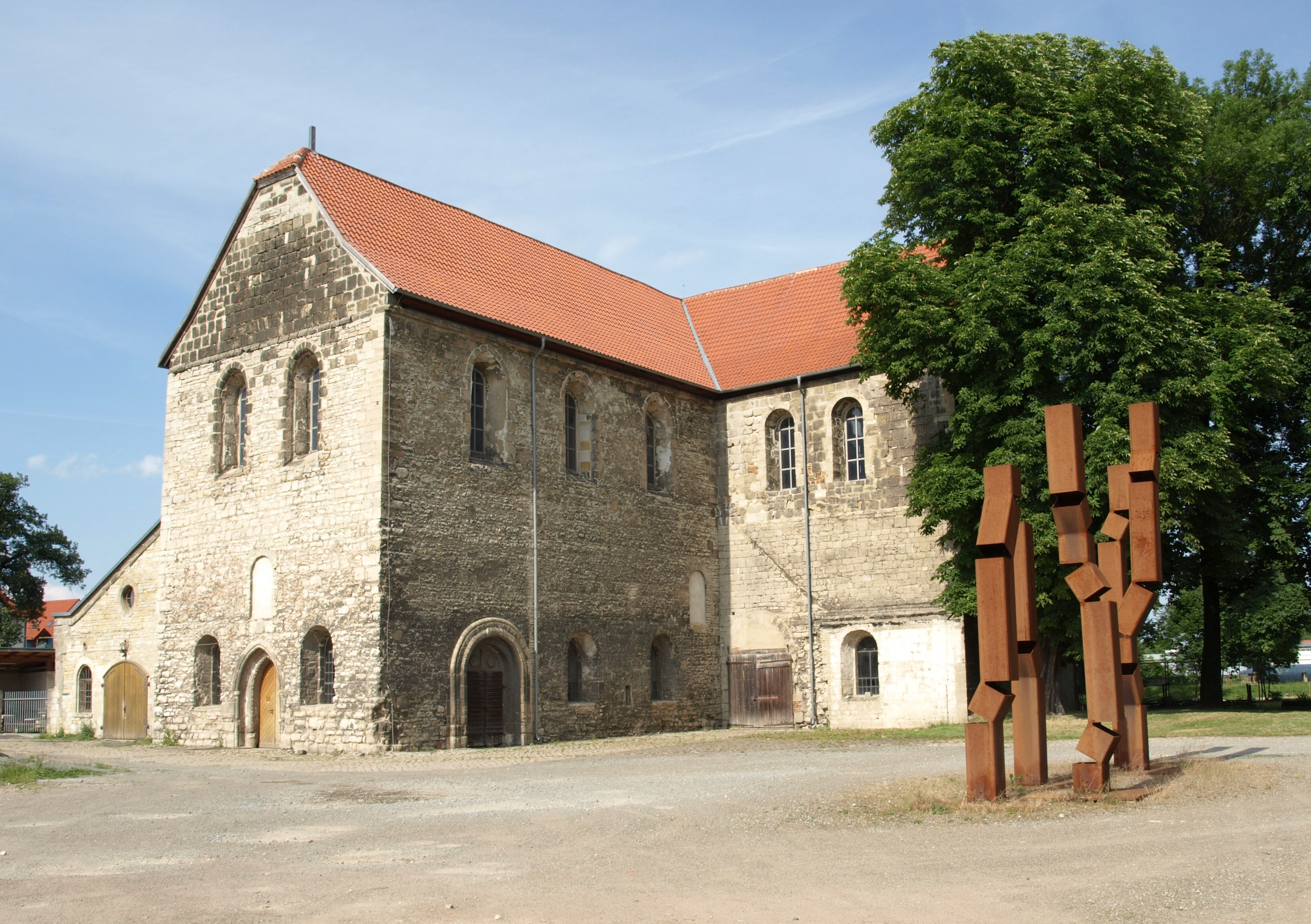
St. Burchardi church in Halberstadt, Germany

Organ²/ASLSP has been playing in Halberstadt for

— 25 years, 2 months, 1 week and 6 days

Organ²/ASLSP (As Slow as Possible) is a musical piece by John Cage and the subject of the second-longest-lasting (after Longplayer) musical performance yet undertaken. Cage wrote it in 1987 for organ, as an adaptation of his 1985 composition ASLSP for piano. A performance of the piano version usually lasts 20 to 70 minutes.

An organ in St. Burchardi church in Halberstadt in 2001 began a performance that is due to end in 2640. This makes it the longest running non-computerized piece currently being performed. The most recent note (an A4 pipe) was added on August 5, 2026. The next note will be played on October 5, 2027.

== History ==
The Friends of the Maryland Summer Institute for the Creative and Performing Arts commissioned the piece for contemporary requirement of a piano competition. Cage used an open format to encourage that no two performances would be the same, and give judges a break from the consistency of most compositions. The score is eight pages.

== Record performances ==
Several attempts have been made for the longest known performance of this piece.

Performer(s)	Duration in hours	Start time	Location	Notes
Francesco Pio Gennarelli	25.003	2025, March 4 14:10pm	Streamed Live on YouTube from Middlesex University	The performance was also open to the public to walk in and listen at any time. It can be viewed in its entirety on YouTube. Current world record holder for longest live performance of a single musical piece performed by a human.
AllRequest_Live "Albert Wright"	24.001	2022, February 4 12:00pm	Streamed Live on Twitch from an undisclosed location	The performance can be viewed in its entirety on YouTube.
Alexander Meszler	24	2023, January 29 5:00pm - January 30 5:00pm	Sundt Organ Studio, Luther College	The performance was livestreamed and open to the public. It was also the longest known single-human performance at a pipe organ.
Diane Luchese	14.93	2009, February 5 8:45am	Towson University	Until 2022, it was the longest completed performance.
Alex Ross, Patrick Wedd, Adrian Foster	8	2015	Christ Church Cathedral, Montreal	World record holder for longest live performance of a single musical piece performed by a team of humans.
Frank Felice	3.5	2016	Online	Performance was delivered online to an iPhone app for ArtsFest 2016 at Butler University. A thirty-five second snippet was posted each day for a year; the whole three and a half hour realization was played as a fixed media piece during the three-day Artsfest. The time used here is for the single performance of the entire piece.

On March 8, 2022, Dr. Christopher Anderson performed what was believed to be a record-breaking 16-hour in-person public performance of ASLSP/2 at Perkins Chapel, Southern Methodist University, from 6am to 10pm. (Unbeknownst to other parties, a livestream of the work was happening around the same time on a podcast.) The work was livestreamed and also had a large public attendance in person. The effort was undertaken in coordination with Bridwell Library at SMU, which hosted an accompanying John Cage-honored festival called the "Festival of Form" that featured other concerts of Cage and Cage-affiliated composers, a special collections exhibit with Cage manuscripts, and a "Dinner in the Dark" at Bridwell Library, composed of all-mushroom dishes and recordings of Cage reciting haiku poetry.

After several organists recognized the growing interest in ASLSP/2 and the desire to “stretch” the piece to its human limits, Dr. Anderson joined Kimberly Marshall, Diane Luchese, and Alexander Meszler to perform ASLSP/2 for 8 full days, 24 hours a day in 6-hour shifts. The 8 days, coming in at 192 hours total, now stands as the record for human group effort public performance. It lasted from noon on January 7 to noon on January 15 at the ASU Organ Hall.

== Halberstadt performance ==
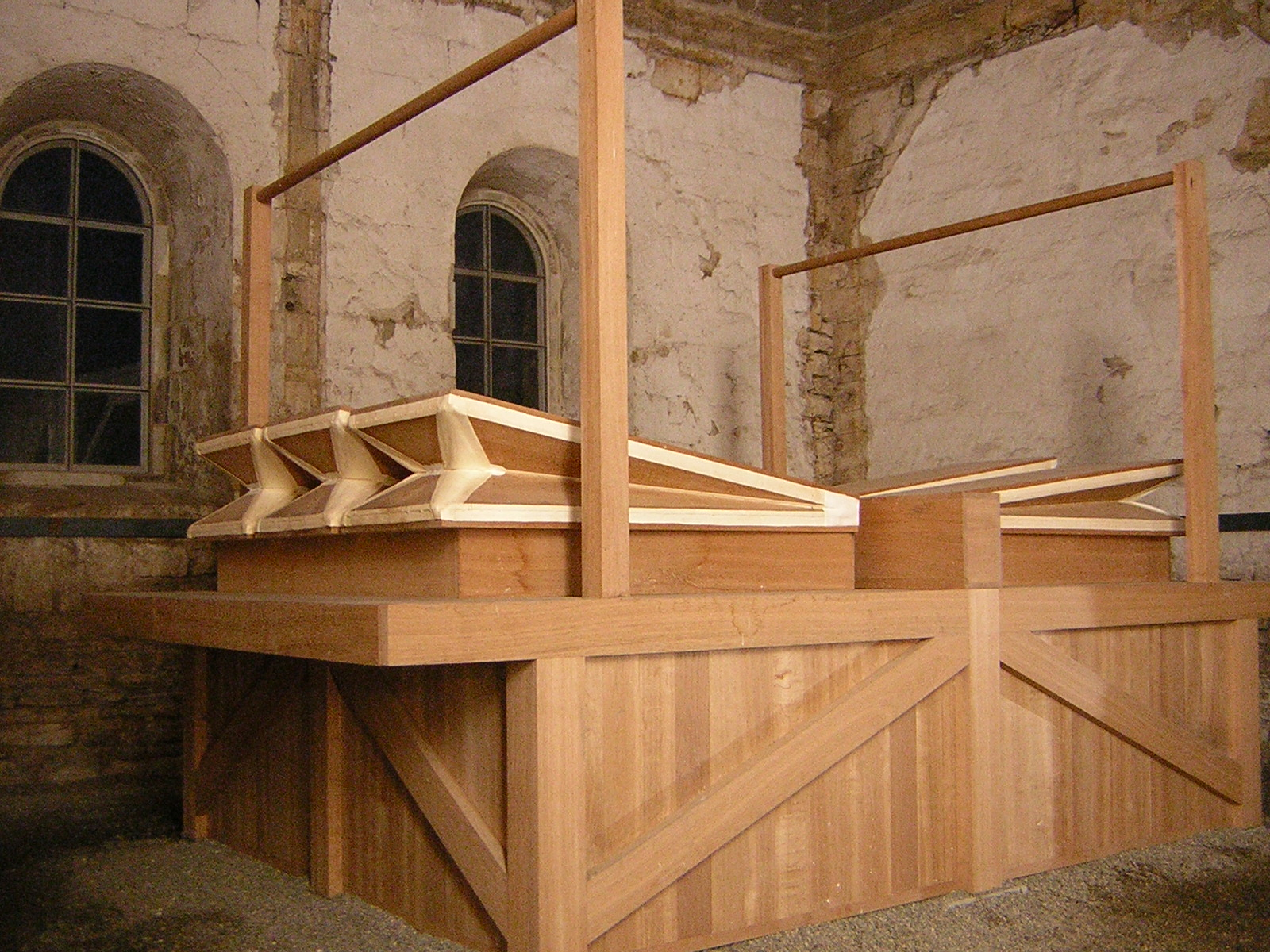
The bellows used for the Halberstadt performance

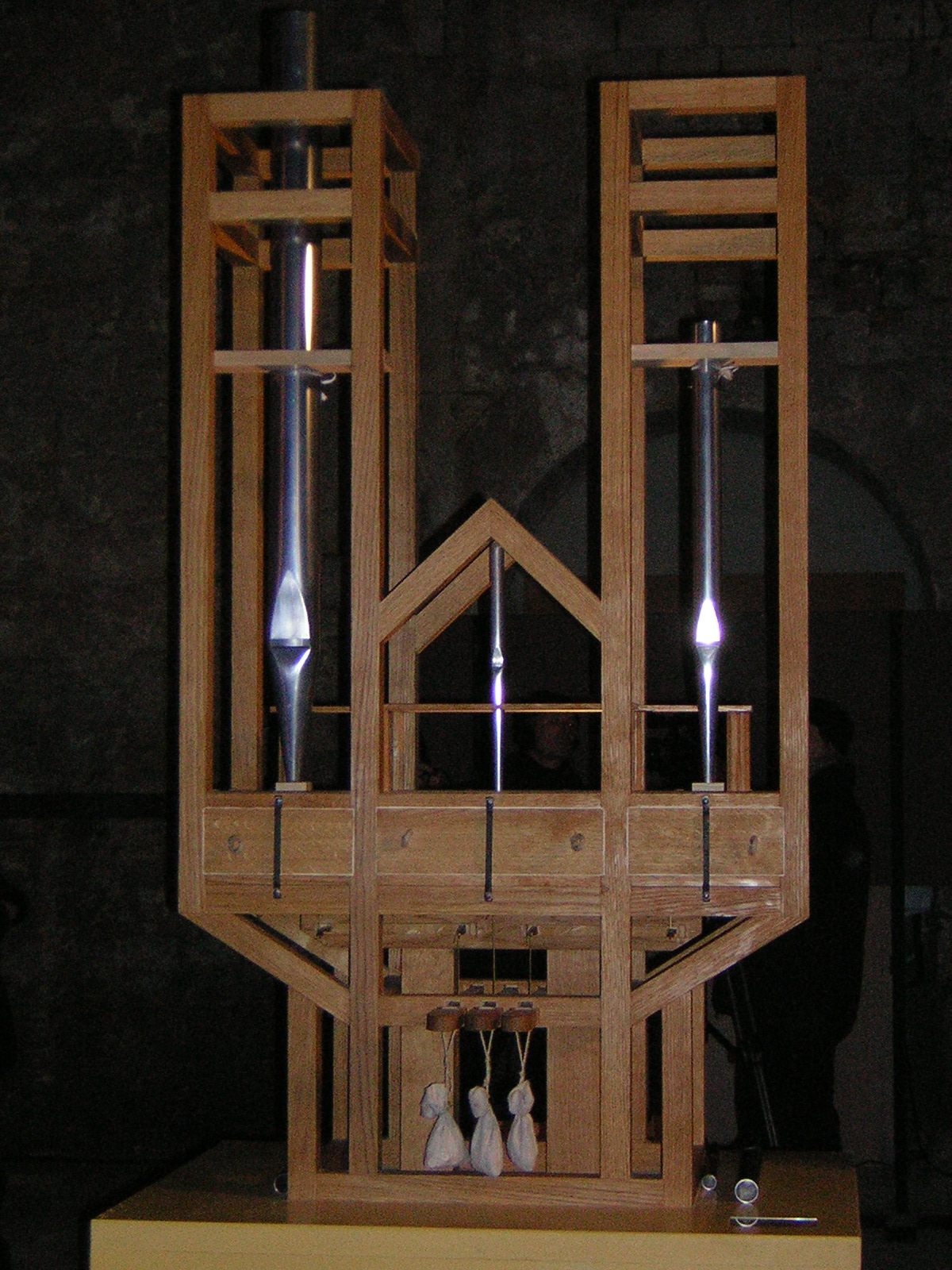
The organ used for the Halberstadt performance

=== Background ===
Musicians and philosophers discussed Cage's instruction to play "as slow as possible" at a conference in 1997, because a properly maintained pipe organ could sound indefinitely. The John Cage Organ Foundation Halberstadt decided to play the piece for 639 years, to mark the time between the first documented permanent organ installation in Halberstadt Cathedral, circa 1361, and the originally proposed start date of 2000. Because of a lack of money, the date was postponed by one year. The chord changes of the first part which ends in 2072 were calculated by Christoph Bossert and Rainer O. Neugebauer. Until August 2021 the Foundation sold plaques commemorating the years through 2640 to fund the performance.

=== The instrument ===
An organ was built specifically for the performance. It is in the church's right transept, with the bellows in the left transept.

In 2011, the organ was encased in acrylic glass to reduce the volume, likely due to potential noise complaints.

=== Performance ===
The Halberstadt performance started on September 5, 2001, with a rest lasting until February 5, 2003, when the first pipes played. Sandbags depress the organ's pedals to maintain the notes. On July 5, 2008, two more organ pipes were added alongside the four already installed and the tone became more complex at 15:33 local time. The bellows provide a constant supply of air to keep the pipes playing. On July 5, 2012, two more organ pipes were taken out, and two were in the organ. The note last changed on August 5, 2026. The performance is scheduled to end on September 5, 2640. All notes are played on the 5th day of the month.

"ASLSP, Halberstadt, Jan 5 2006 note change"
The note change of January 5, 2006, takes place at 8:35 in this audio clip.

John Cage Organ²/ASLSP (639 years, part 1: 70 years)

Impulse	Action	Notes	Date	Chord length
1	Begin	none	September 5, 2001	
2	Sound	G♯_{4}, B_{4}, G♯_{5}	February 5, 2003	518 d
3	Sound	E_{3}, E_{4}	July 5, 2004	516 d
4	Release	G♯_{4}, B_{4}	July 5, 2005	365 d
5	Sound	A_{4}, C_{5}, F♯_{5}	January 5, 2006	184 d
6	Release	E_{3}, E_{4}	May 5, 2006	120 d
7	Sound	C_{4}, A♭_{4}	July 5, 2008	792 d
8	Release	C_{4}	November 5, 2008	123 d
9	Sound	D_{4}, E_{5}	February 5, 2009	92 d
10	Release	E_{5}	July 5, 2010	515 d
11	Release	D_{4}, G♯_{5}	February 5, 2011	215 d
12	Sound	C_{4} (16′), D♭_{4} (16′)	August 5, 2011	181 d
12	Release	A♭_{4}	August 5, 2011	181 d
13	Release	A_{4}, C_{5}, F♯_{5}	July 5, 2012	335 d
14	Sound	D♯_{4}, A♯_{4}, E_{5}	October 5, 2013	457 d
15	Sound	G♯_{3}, E_{4}	September 5, 2020	2,527 d
16	Release	G♯_{3}	February 5, 2022	518 d
17	Sound	D_{4}	February 5, 2024	730 d
18	Sound	A_{4}	August 5, 2026	912 d
19	Release	E_{4}	October 5, 2027	426 d
20	Sound	G_{3}	April 5, 2028	183 d
21	Release	D_{4}	August 5, 2028	122 d
22	Release	A_{4}	March 5, 2030	577 d
23	Release	D♯_{4}, E_{5}	September 5, 2030	184 d
24	Release	G_{3}	May 5, 2033	973 d
25	Sound	B_{3}	December 5, 2033	214 d
26	Sound	F_{3}, D_{4}	August 5, 2034	243 d
27	Release	F_{3}, D_{4}	September 5, 2034	31 d
28	Release	B_{3}	October 5, 2034	30 d
29	Sound	D♭_{5}	June 5, 2035	243 d
30	Sound	A_{2} (16′)	September 5, 2037	823 d
30	Release	D♭_{5}	September 5, 2037	823 d
31	Sound	A♭_{4}, A♭_{5}	March 5, 2038	181 d
32	Release	A♭_{5}	July 5, 2038	122 d
33	Release	A♭_{4}	May 5, 2039	304 d

Impulse	Action	Notes	Date	Chord length
34	Sound	D_{4}, A♭_{4}	December 5, 2039	214 d
35	Release	D_{4}, A♭_{4}	April 5, 2040	122 d
36	Sound	D♭_{3}, B♭_{3}	January 5, 2041	275 d
37	Release	D♭_{3}, B♭_{3}	March 5, 2042	424 d
38	Release	A_{2} (16′)	November 5, 2043	610 d
39	Sound	A_{3}, D_{4}	July 5, 2044	243 d
40	Sound	E_{4}	March 5, 2045	243 d
40	Release	A♯_{4}	March 5, 2045	243 d
41	Sound	B_{4}, C_{5}, A♯_{5}	March 5, 2046	365 d
42	Release	C_{4} (16′), B_{4}, C_{5}, A♯_{5}	October 5, 2047	579 d
43	Sound	C_{3} (16′)	February 5, 2049	489 d
44	Sound	D♯_{4}, A_{4}	April 5, 2050	424 d
45	Release	A_{3}, D_{4}, E_{4}	February 5, 2051	306 d
46	Release	D♯_{4}, A_{4}	November 5, 2051	273 d
47	Sound	E♭_{3}, B_{3}	May 5, 2053	547 d
48	Release	C_{3} (16′)	November 5, 2054	549 d
49	Release	E♭_{3}, B_{3}	July 5, 2056	608 d
50	Sound	B♭_{4}	August 5, 2057	396 d
51	Sound	A_{2} (16′)	May 5, 2058	273 d
52	Release	A_{2} (16′)	November 5, 2059	549 d
53	Sound	G♭_{4}, C_{5}, D♭_{5}	April 5, 2060	152 d
54	Release	G♭_{4}, C_{5}, D♭_{5}	June 5, 2060	61 d
55	Sound	E_{4}	November 5, 2060	153 d
55	Release	B♭_{4}	November 5, 2060	153 d
56	Sound	B_{4}, C_{5}, E♭_{5}, C_{6}	February 5, 2061	92 d
57	Release	C_{5}, E♭_{5}, C_{6}	April 5, 2061	59 d
58	Sound	D_{4}	September 5, 2061	153 d
58	Release	E_{4}	September 5, 2061	153 d
59	Sound	A♯_{3}, D♯_{4}, F♯_{4}	August 5, 2062	334 d
60	Release	A♯_{3}, F♯_{4}	February 5, 2064	549 d
61	Sound	A_{3}, A_{4}	January 5, 2067	1,065 d
61	Release	D♯_{4}	January 5, 2067	1,065 d
62	Release	D_{4}	June 5, 2067	151 d
63	Release	A_{3}, A_{4}	July 5, 2068	396 d
64	Release	D♭_{4} (16′)	March 5, 2071	973 d
65	Release	B_{4}	July 5, 2071	122 d

== See also ==
- As Long as Possible, a GIF-based visual art work named in tribute to As Slow as Possible
- List of compositions by John Cage
- Longplayer
