= 2026 Mauritian riots =

Riots and protests following a shooting of a civilian by police

- Date: 7 October 2026 - 13 October 2026
- Location: La Caverne, Vacoas-Phoenix, Mauritius •Goodlands •Bambous •Saint Croix; 20°18′15″S 57°28′45″E
- Caused by: Water shortages Cost of living crisis Shooting of a young woman by a police officer
- Methods: Rioting, clashes with law enforcement, looting, property damage, protests
- Status: Concluded

Casualties
- Arrested: 94

The 2026 Mauritian riots was a national-scale rioting and protest in Mauritius. Protest action started in La Caverne-Phoenix in Vacoas-Phoenix on 7 October over the issue of nation wide water shortages and living cost increases. The following day protesters blockaded roads in nearby St-Paul and protests had spread to the Highlands area.

Protest action turned to rioting following the shooting of a 27-year-old woman, Élodie Thomas, on 9 October by a police officer at a roadblock in Camp Levieux, whilst she was transiting from work. A team of 13 surgeons from India were mobilised to assist the Mauritian medical team and she underwent 7 hours of surgery to remove a bullet which was stuck in the back of her neck. Police sergeant Gautam Singh Taukoor, 57 years of age, was soon arrested. Van driver Rudy Soobrayen revealed to the press that his van was shot at by police, soon after being bullied by Sergeant Taukoor who even held his pistol against Soobrayen's head, and threatened to shoot him.It was the worst incidence of mass rioting in Mauritius since the country's 1999 riots.

On 12 October, protesters burnt down a police station in the town of Rose-Hill using Molotov cocktails and blockaded roads across the country. Companies like Fast Foods Ltd & Winners Bambous were looted and vandalised. Rioters caused so much damage to the Metro Express tram system, especially in Barkly, that services were suspended. A curfew was declared on 13 October and the authorities claimed that order had been restored. By then a McDonalds in Beau-Bassin had been vandalized and a number vehicles set on fire.

It is believed that various WhatsApp groups, with names such as The Burning Paradise and Gen Z, were used to incite young disenfranchised Mauritians to cause social unrest and to destroy public property in exchange for payments. Prime Minister Navin Ramgoolam and his supporter Bruneau Laurette blamed drug traffickers for inciting violence.
