= Akash Choolun =

Mauritian footballer

Personal information
- Full name: Akash Choolun
- Date of birth: 20 September 1978 (age 48)
- Place of birth: Mauritius
- Position: Goalkeeper

Senior career*
Years	Team	Apps	(Gls)
2002–2008	AS Rivière du Rempart	?	(?)

International career
2002	Mauritius	1	(0)
- * Club domestic league appearances and goals

Akash Choolun (born 20 September 1978) is a Mauritian former international footballer who played as a goalkeeper. He won one cap for the Mauritius national football team in 2002.
