= Letter to the Right Honourable the Lord Mayor of Sydney =

1986 open letter by Queen Elizabeth II

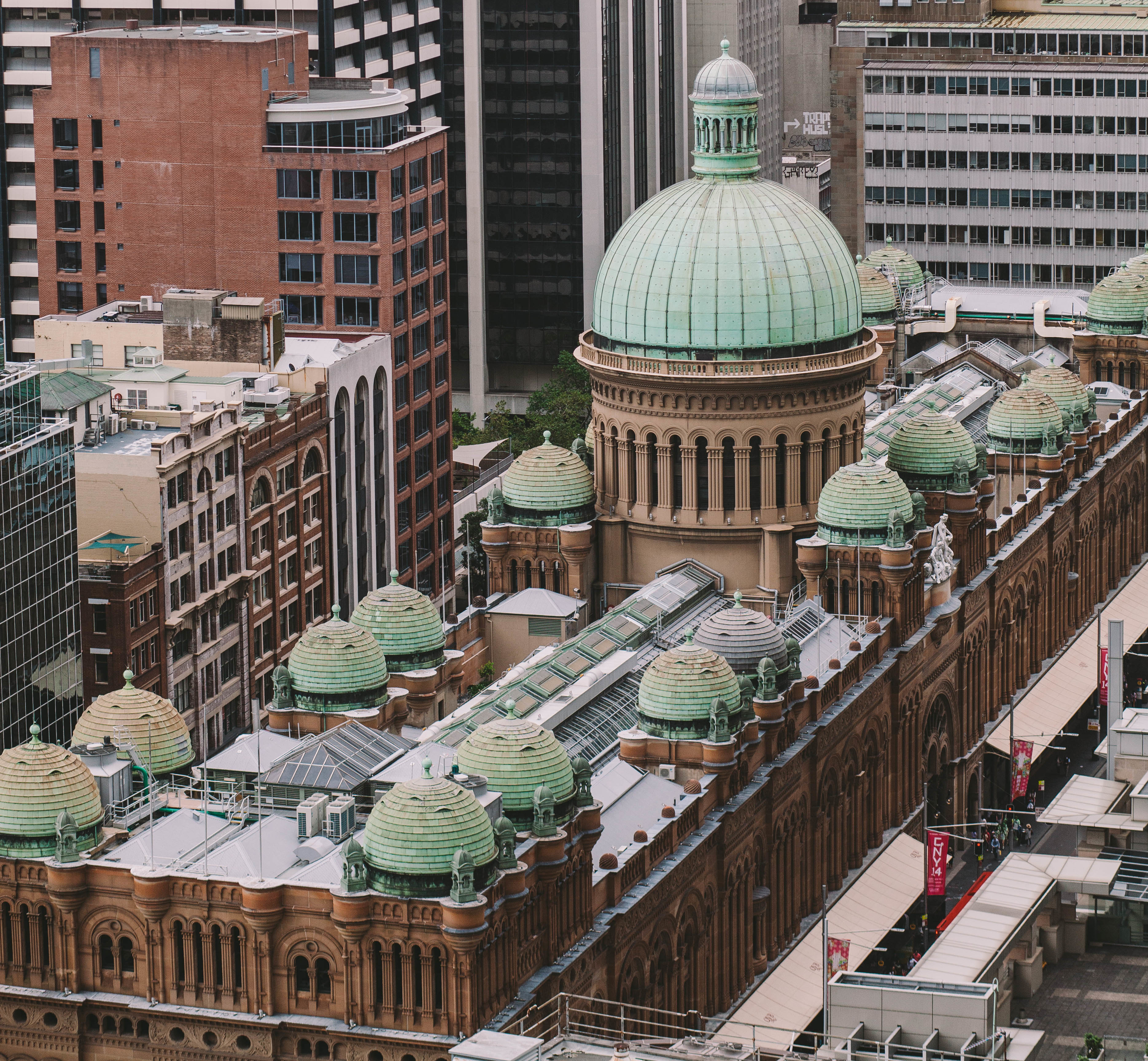
The Queen Victoria Building and its domes, the largest of which contains the letter.

The Letter to the Right Honourable the Lord Mayor of Sydney is a handwritten open letter written in November 1986 by Queen Elizabeth II during her visit to the Queen Victoria Building in Sydney, Australia. It is addressed to the Right Honourable the Lord Mayor of Sydney and all of the city's inhabitants.

Its contents are unknown, as the letter was sealed immediately after writing with instructions not to open it until 2085, making the letter a time capsule. It is currently kept in a glass case located in a restricted area at the top of the main dome of the building.

The envelope reads as follows:

To the Rt. Hon, the LORD MAYOR of SYDNEY,
AUSTRALIA
Greetings
On a suitable day to be selected by you in the year 2085 A.D.
would you please open this envelope and convey to the
citizens of SYDNEY my message to them.
Elizabeth R
