= Baku City Master Plan =

Master plan for Baku, Azerbaijan

The Baku City Master Plan (Azerbaijani: Bakı şəhərinin baş planı) is the latest urban development master plan for Baku, the capital of Azerbaijan. It is managed by Azerbaijani State Committee on Urban Planning and Architecture (SCUPA). The plan envisages sweeping urban changes between 2020 and 2040, particularly zoning, new engineering and communication systems and renewal of transport infrastructure. About 122,000 residential buildings in Baku are planned to be demolished under this plan.

Preparations for the plan were announced in July 2018 according to the order of Azerbaijani President Ilham Aliyev. However, some large-scale renovations and demolitions were conducted in the city earlier, in the 2010s.
