= Guillaume Domingue =

Mauritian radio personality (1985–2022)

- Born: 29 November 1985; Mauritius
- Died: 18 January 2022 (aged 36)
- Occupations: Radio Jockey, Presenter

Guillaume Domingue (29 November 1985 – 18 January 2022) was a Mauritian radio jockey and presenter. He was best known as the host of the show Morning Live on Mauritius Broadcasting Corporation's Kool FM from 6hr to 9hr.

== Life and career ==
Domingue was the star host of Radio Plus (Mauritius), where he had started his radio career and also worked at the Mauritius Broadcasting Corporation and Wazaa FM (Mauritius).

== Death ==
He died on 18 January 2022, at the age of 36.
