= Bruneau Laurette =

Mauritian politician

- Born: June 20, 1974 (age 52); Mauritius
- Education: Chartered Institute of Environmental Health
- Occupation: Politician
- Years active: 2020-present
- Political party: Linion Sitwayin, One Moris

Bruneau Laurette (born 20 June 1974) is a Mauritian social activist and politician.

== Political impact ==
On 29 August 2020, Bruneau Laurette gathered a mass of the Mauritian population who protested to bring in a drastic change in the way politics was done in Mauritius and was in favour of voting a new government.

On 2 March 2021, Bruneau Laurette, announced the creation of his political party. On 7 March 2023, Laurette joined One Moris, the party of Sherry Singh, former CEO of Mauritius Telecom.

== Arrest ==
On 4 November 2022, Bruneau Laurette and his son were arrested. The police seized firearms and 46 kg of hashish in the activist's house and car. According to Laurette, he was the victim of a set-up. Laurette was released on bail on 27 February 2023.
