= Westley Laboucherie =

Mauritian footballer

Personal information
- Full name: Westley Laboucherie
- Date of birth: 6 October 1978 (age 48)
- Place of birth: Mauritius
- Position: Midfielder

Senior career*
Years	Team	Apps	(Gls)
2000–2002	Olympique Loka	?	(?)
2001–2003	Grand Port United	?	(?)
2003–	Savanne SC	?	(?)

International career
2002	Mauritius	2	(0)
- * Club domestic league appearances and goals

Westley Laboucherie (born 6 October 1978) is a Mauritian footballer who currently plays as a midfielder for Savanne SC. He won two caps for the Mauritius national football team in 2002.
