= Trinity Buoy Wharf =

Trinity Buoy Wharf Light Blackwall Bow Creek Lighthouse
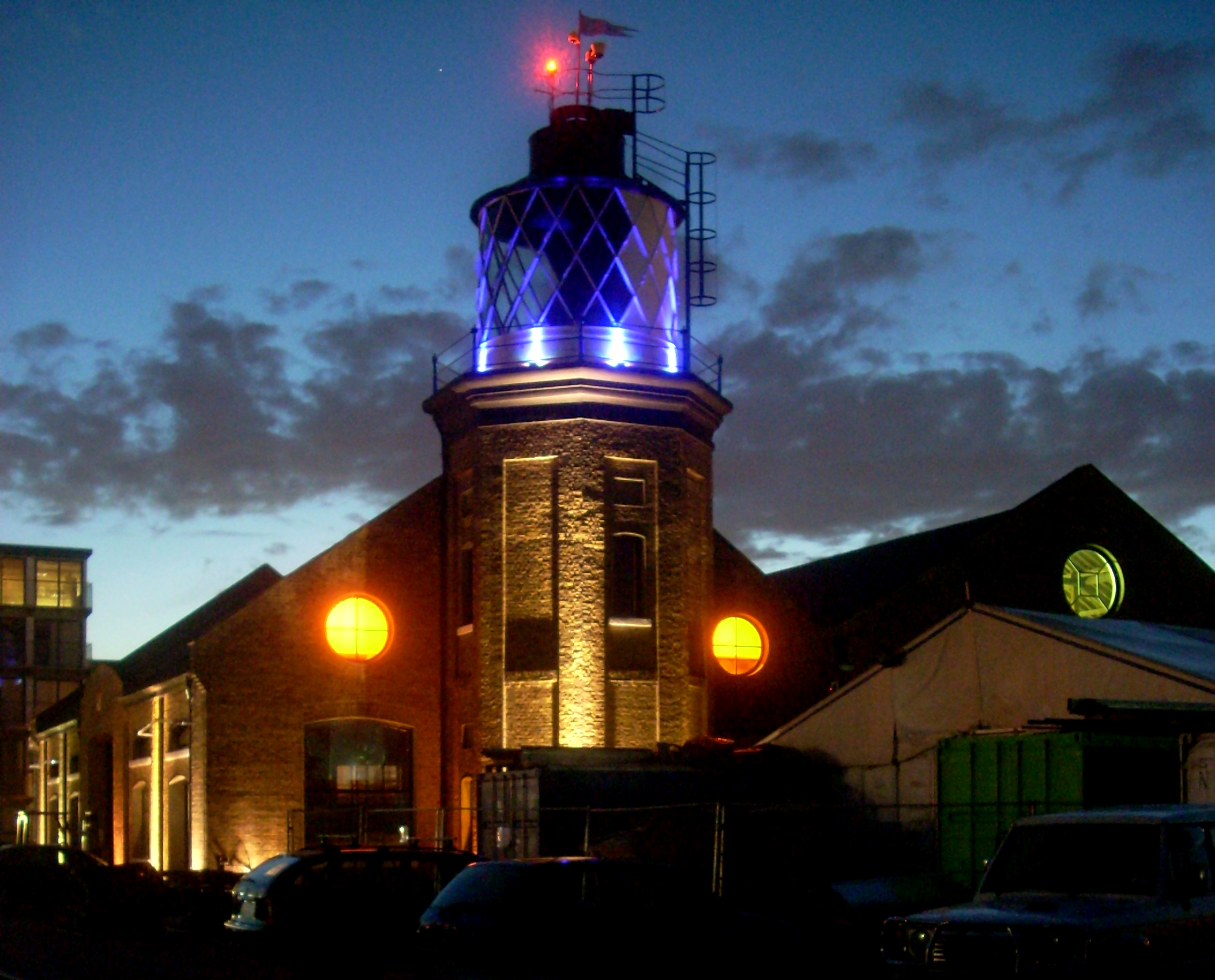
- Bow Creek Lighthouse at Trinity Buoy Wharf
- Location: Leamouth; Tower Hamlets; England
- Coordinates: 51°30′27.8″N 00°00′29.9″E
- Constructed: 1863
- Construction: brick tower
- Shape: octagonal tower with balcony and lantern attached to 1-storey depot building
- Markings: unpainted tower, black lantern
- Operator: Trinity Buoy Wharf

Light
- Deactivated: 1988

Trinity Buoy Wharf is London's only surviving lighthouse, located by the confluence of the River Thames and Bow Creek on the Leamouth Peninsula, Poplar. It lies within the London Borough of Tower Hamlets. The lighthouse no longer functions, but is the home of various art projects such as Longplayer. It is sometimes known as Bow Creek Lighthouse.

== History ==
In 1803, the site began to be used by the Elder Brethren of Trinity House, now known as Corporation of Trinity House. The seawall was reconstructed in 1822 by George Mundy of Old Ford. The site was used as a maintenance depot, and storage facility for the many buoys that aided navigation on the Thames; and the wharf for docking and repair of lightships.

The original lighthouse was built by the engineer of Trinity House, James Walker, in 1852, and was demolished in the late 1920s. A second lighthouse, which survives, was built in 1864–66 by James Douglass for Trinity House. The lantern at the top of the tower came from the Paris Exposition of 1867, where Trinity House had used it to demonstrate Professor Holmes's improved system of electric lighting for lighthouses. Initially it housed ('for experimental purposes') the optical equipment which had been shown at the Exposition. Michael Faraday carried out experiments there. It was later used to test lighting systems for Trinity House's lights around England and Wales. Both lighthouses were also used for training prospective lighthouse keepers.

== Late 20th century ==
In December 1988, Trinity House closed the wharf, and the area was acquired by the London Docklands Development Corporation. In 1998, the LDDC set up the Trinity Buoy Wharf Trust with a 125-year lease to hold the land for the people of London. Urban Space Holdings Ltd took control of the site on a long lease. The site has been, and continues to be, developed as "a centre for the arts and cultural activities". Enhancements include studio space (including unusual architecture based on used shipping containers) and exhibition space.

== Container City ==
Urban Space Holdings used the area to develop Container City in 2001, a studio and office complex made from recycled sea shipping containers. The original project was made from 80% recycled material. It is principally a means of utilising standard forty-foot equivalent unit shipping containers, at the end of their life, to produce flexible accommodation and offices at low cost. "Container City 1" took 5 months to complete, taking 4 days to install. The Container City project proved very popular and in 2002 "Container City 2" was completed delivering a further 22 studios across 5 floors in with a brightly coloured ziggurat design. A further extension to the Container City Complex was the "Riverside Building" located next to the Thames facing The O_{2} dome. This was yet another architectural design providing an additional 22 studio spaces.

A similar technique was used in Container Learn, a 2001 project for Tower Hamlets College, providing twelve extra classrooms on a site with limited space and completed in the time between terms. The name is a trademark of "Urban Space Management". The company have now completed sixteen projects utilising the technique, which is suited to short and medium term land use – when the land becomes required for other uses, the containers can be reused elsewhere.

== 21st century ==
In November 2005, the University of East London opened Fine Art studios at the wharf; and in September 2009 the university opened two dance studios at the Institute of Performing Arts Development in The Chainstore at the wharf.

Faraday School, a not-for-profit primary school run by the New Model School Company Limited, opened in September 2009.

The wharf is also the home of Thames Clippers who have offices and base all their boats on the pier there.

In April 2013 the former Cory Environmental Thames Lighterage tug Swiftstone moved to Trinity Buoy Wharf from Greenwich, and Swiftstone Trust's volunteers began a full restoration of the vessel which can be seen underway at the year Thames Barge Driving event. In 2016 Trinity Buoy Wharf Trust acquired two historic tugboats, the Knocker White and the Varlet from the Museum of London Docklands. Both vessels are listed by National Historic Ships on the National Register of Historic Vessels.

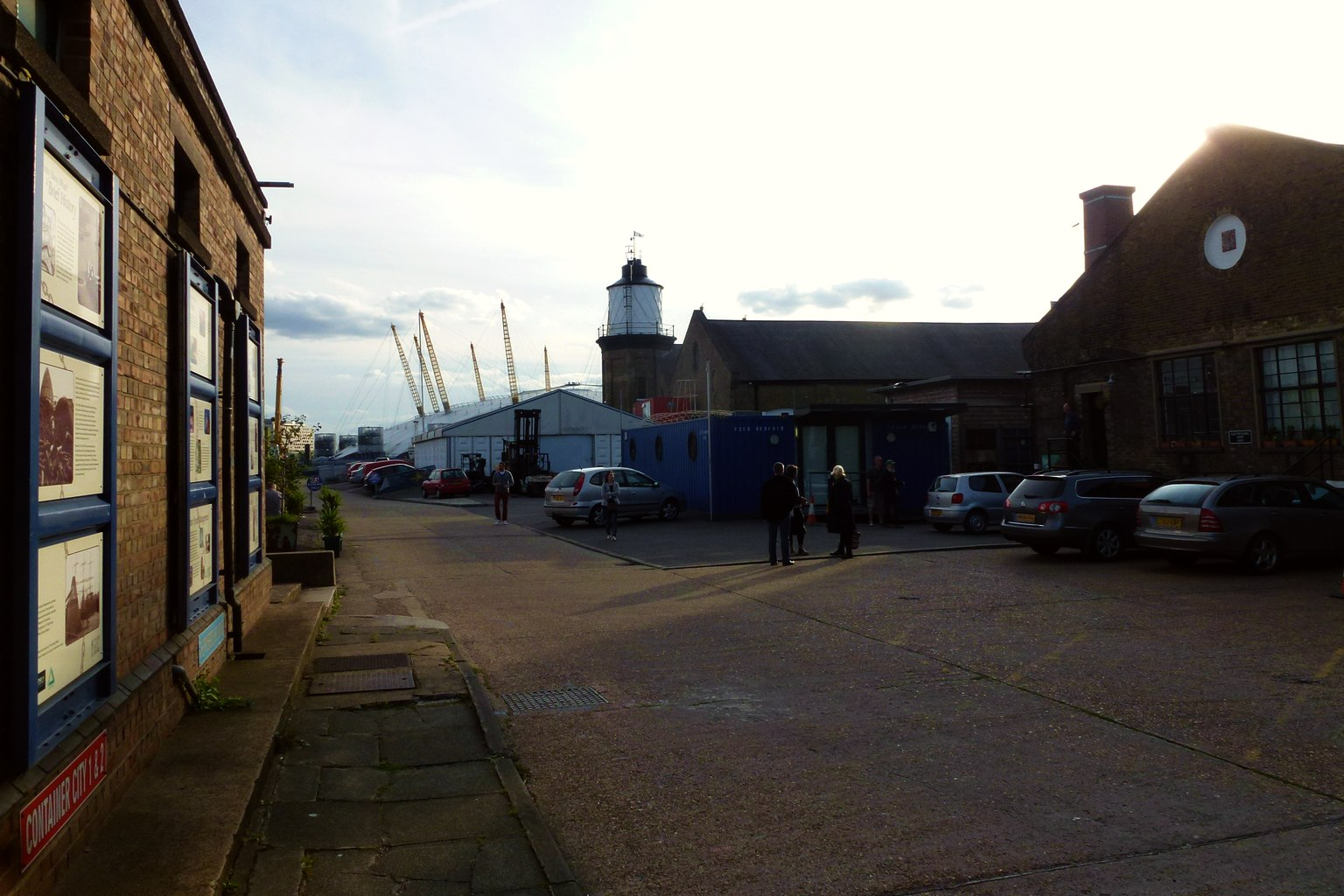
Trinity Buoy Wharf in September 2012.

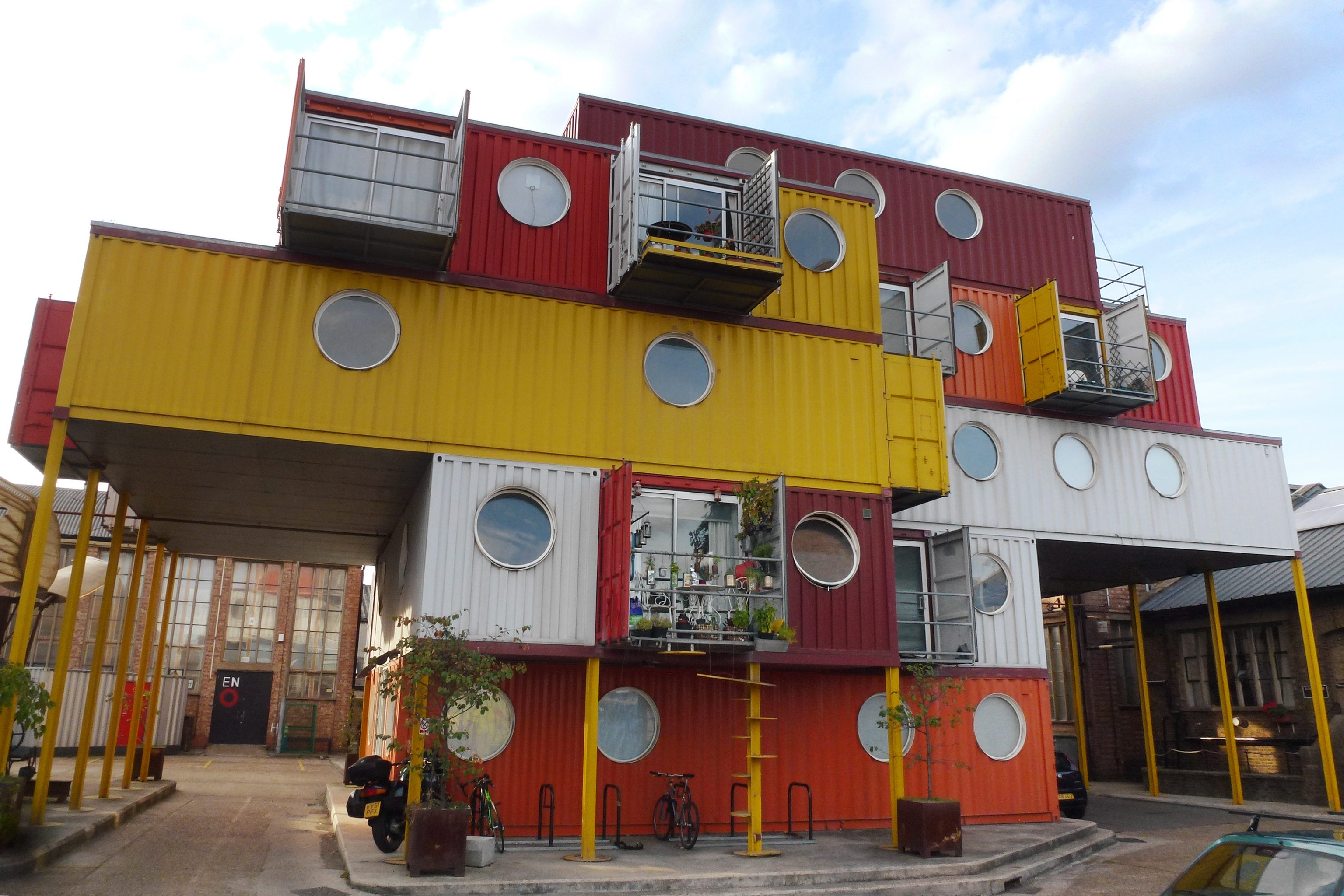
Container City 2 at Trinity Buoy Wharf.

Illustration of the structure of Container City I and Container City II showing how the shipping containers (each nominally 40'×8'×8') are stacked.

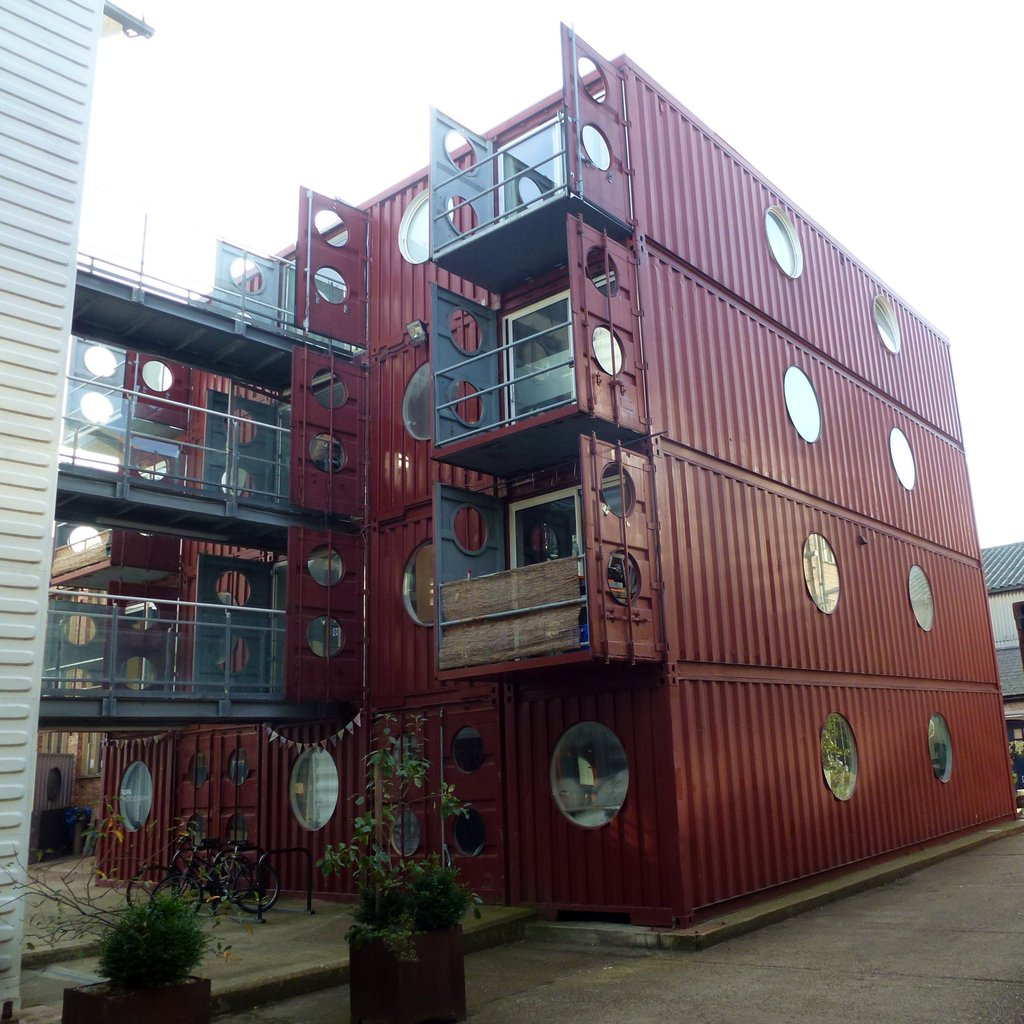
Container City I

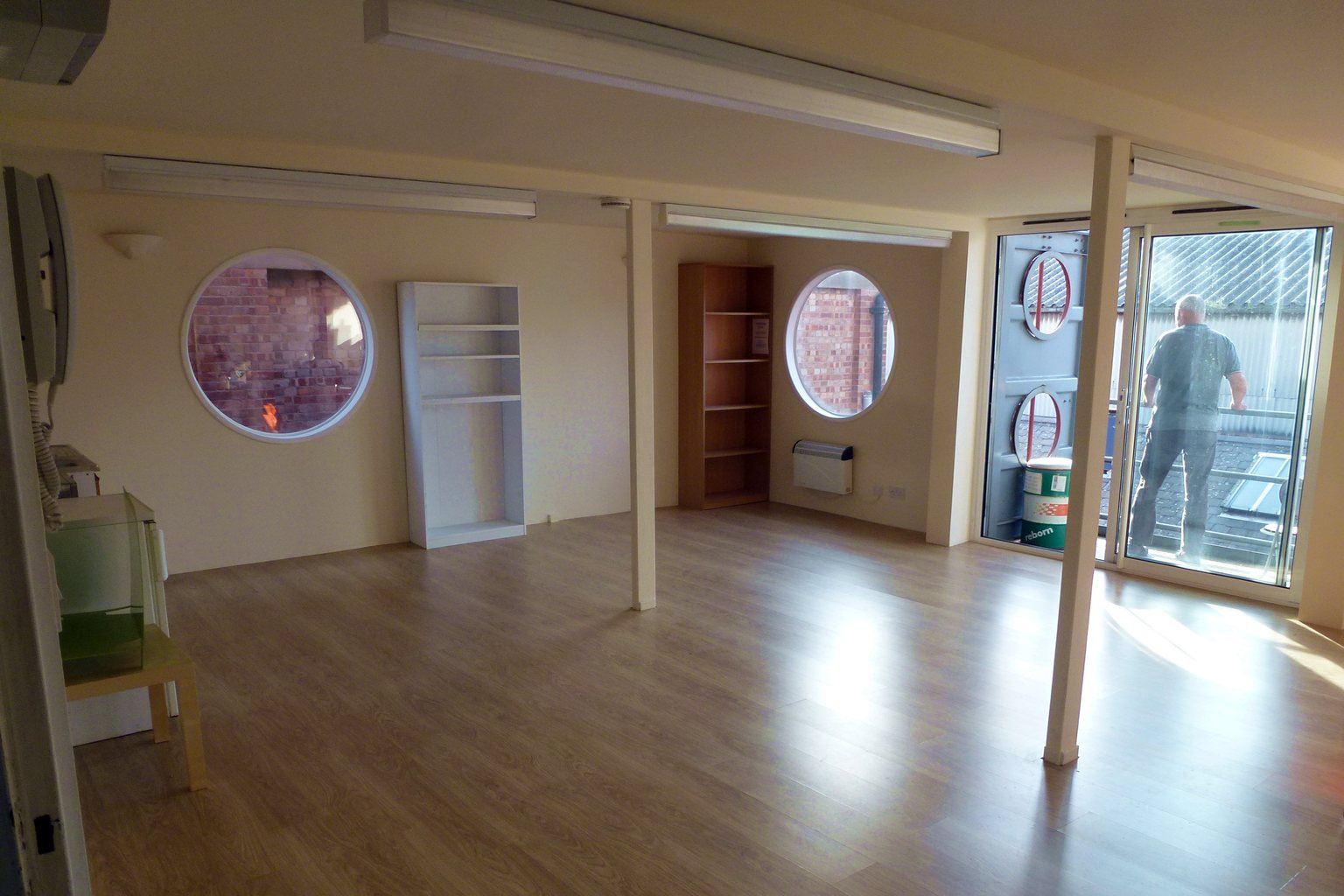
Interior of a studio in Container City I

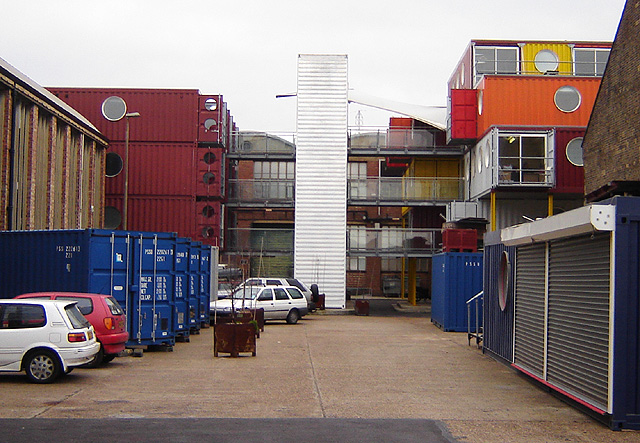
Container City I and Container City II with an upturned container containing a stairwell between them

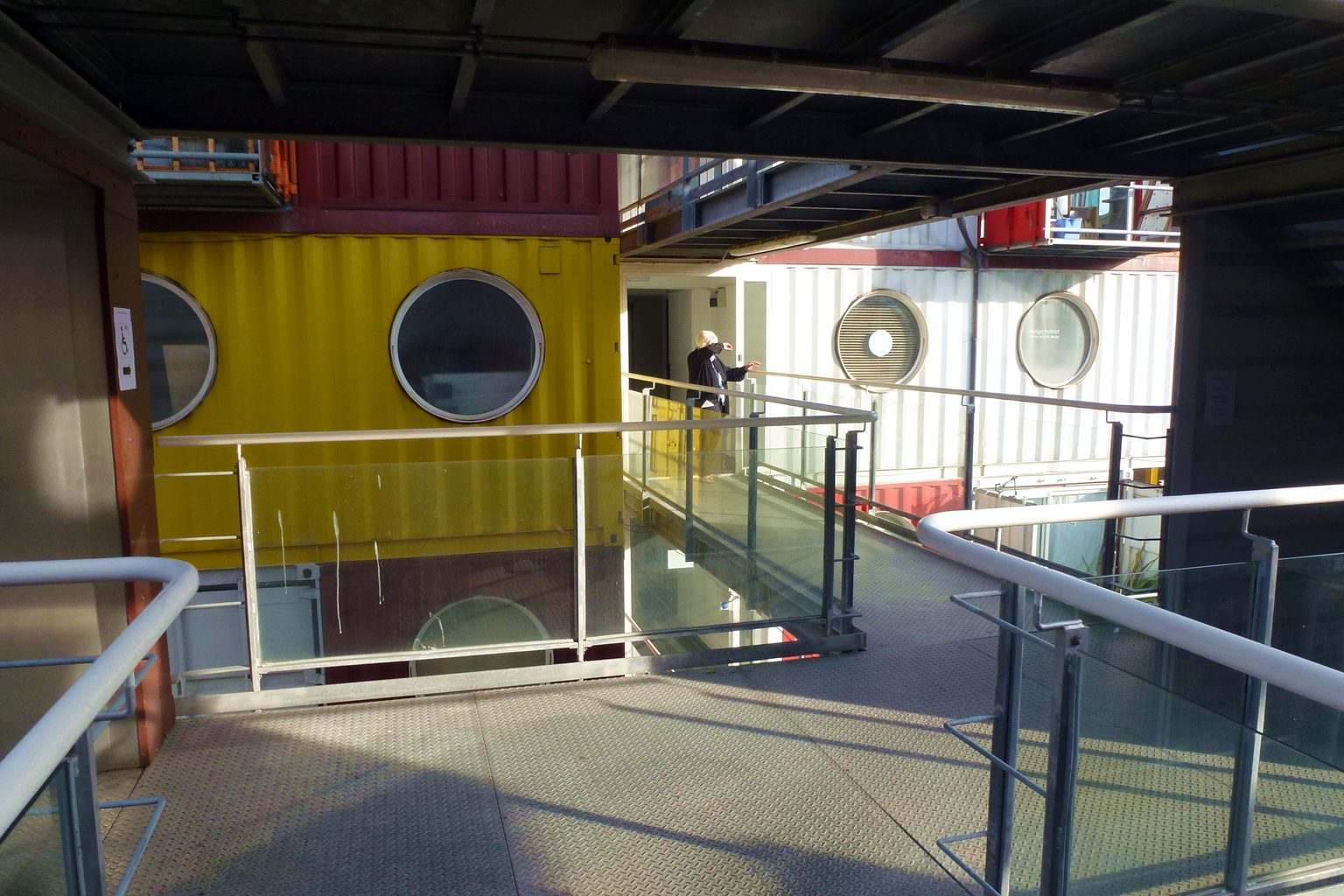
The second-floor walkway linking Container City I and Container City II

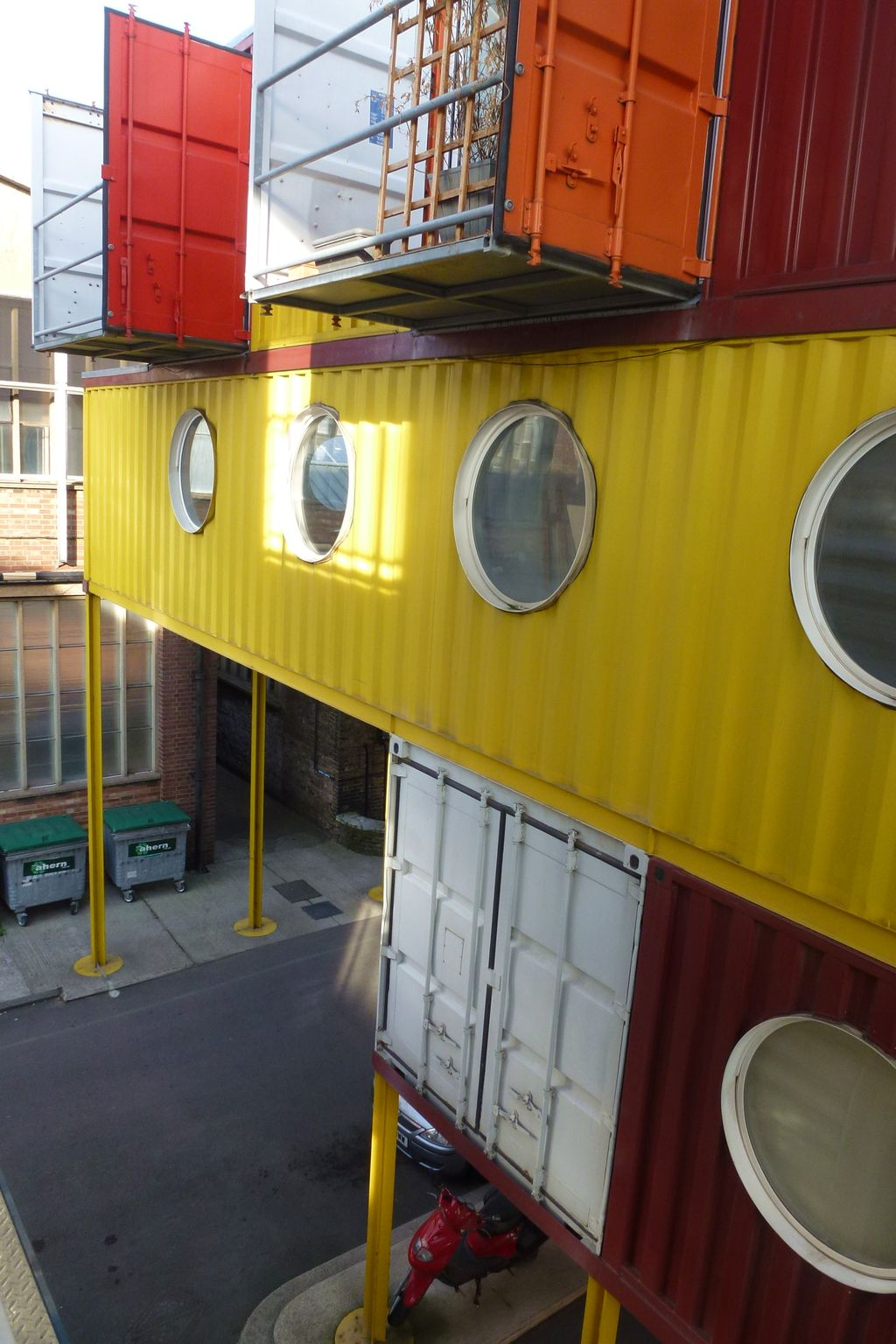
View of Container City II from that walkway

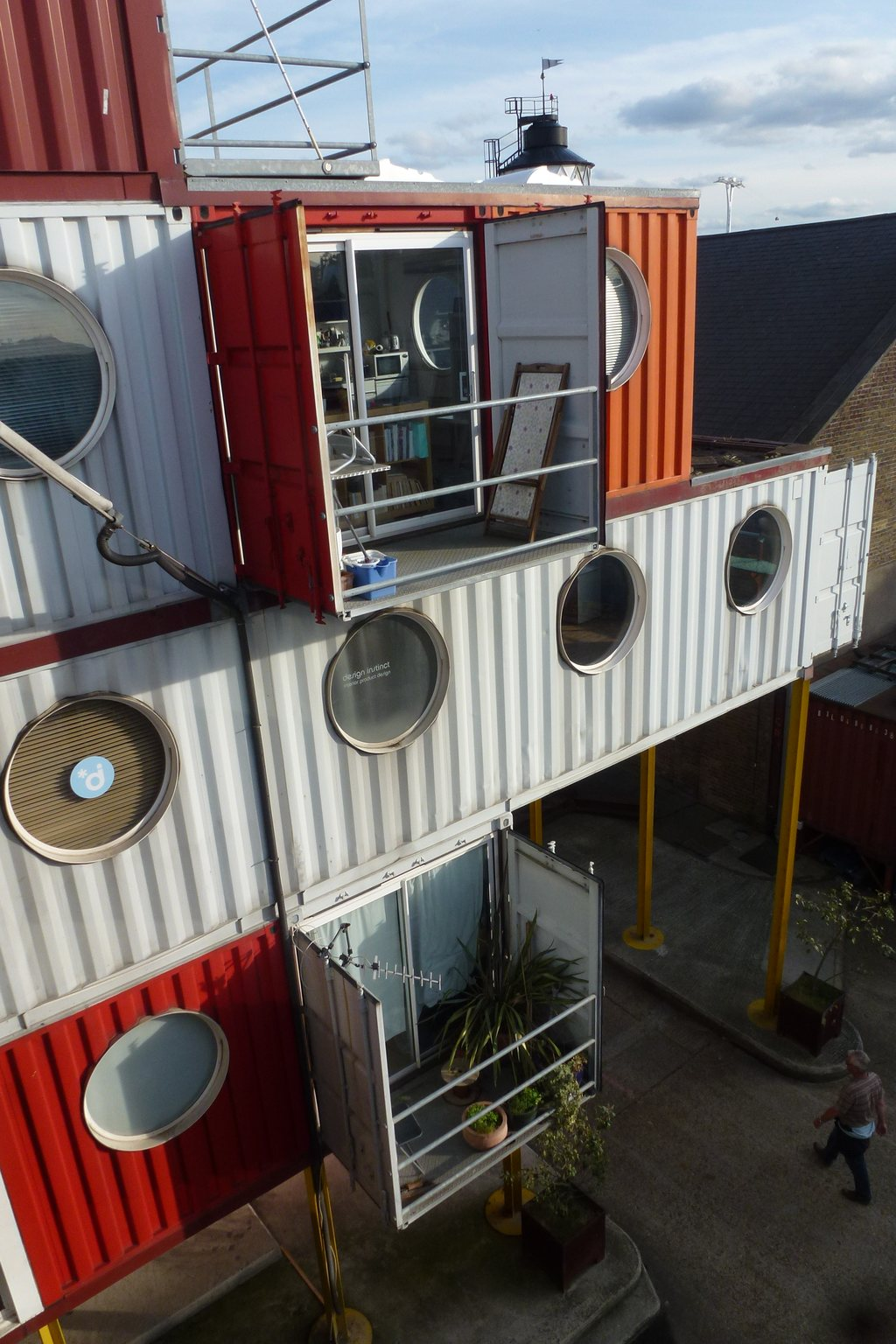
View of Container City II from the third-floor walkway linking Container City I and Container City II

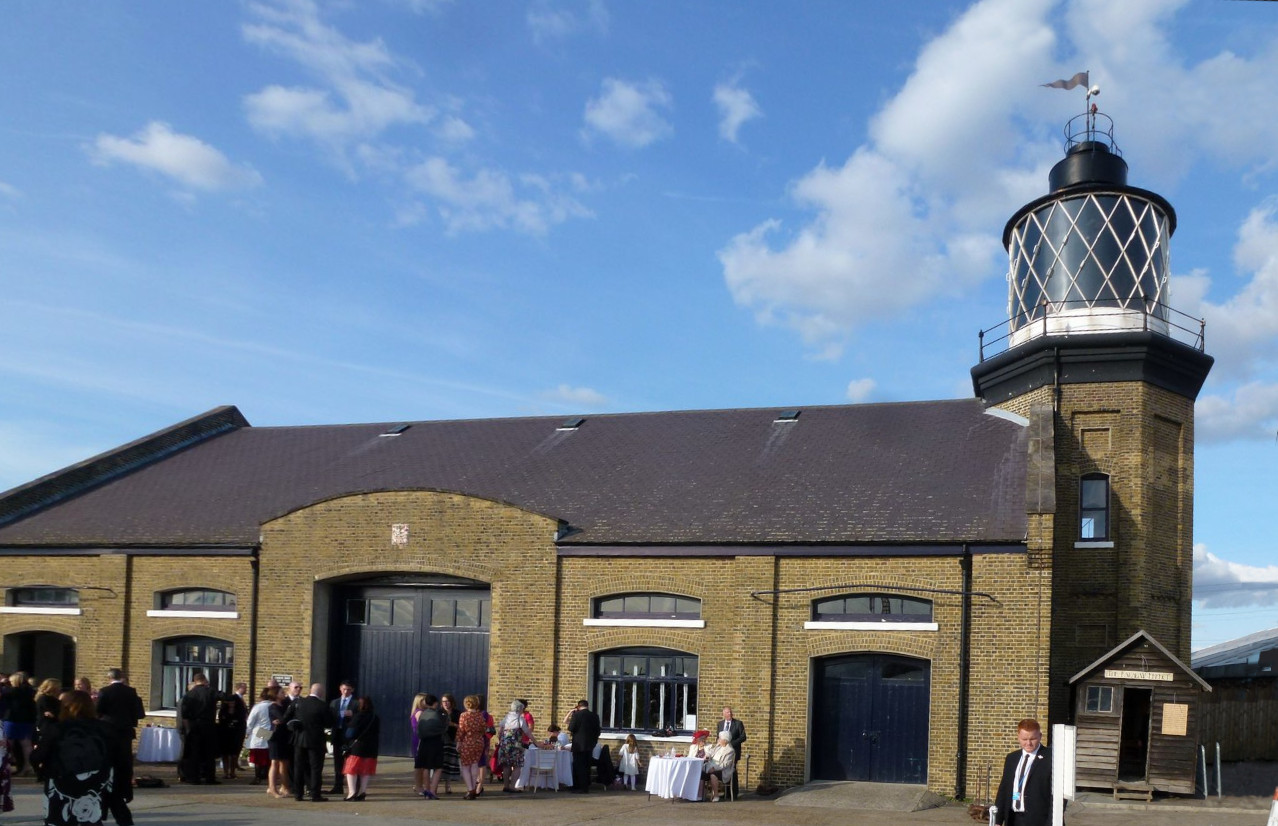
Bow Creek Lighthouse, a warehouse and a shed exhibiting Michael Faraday's work.

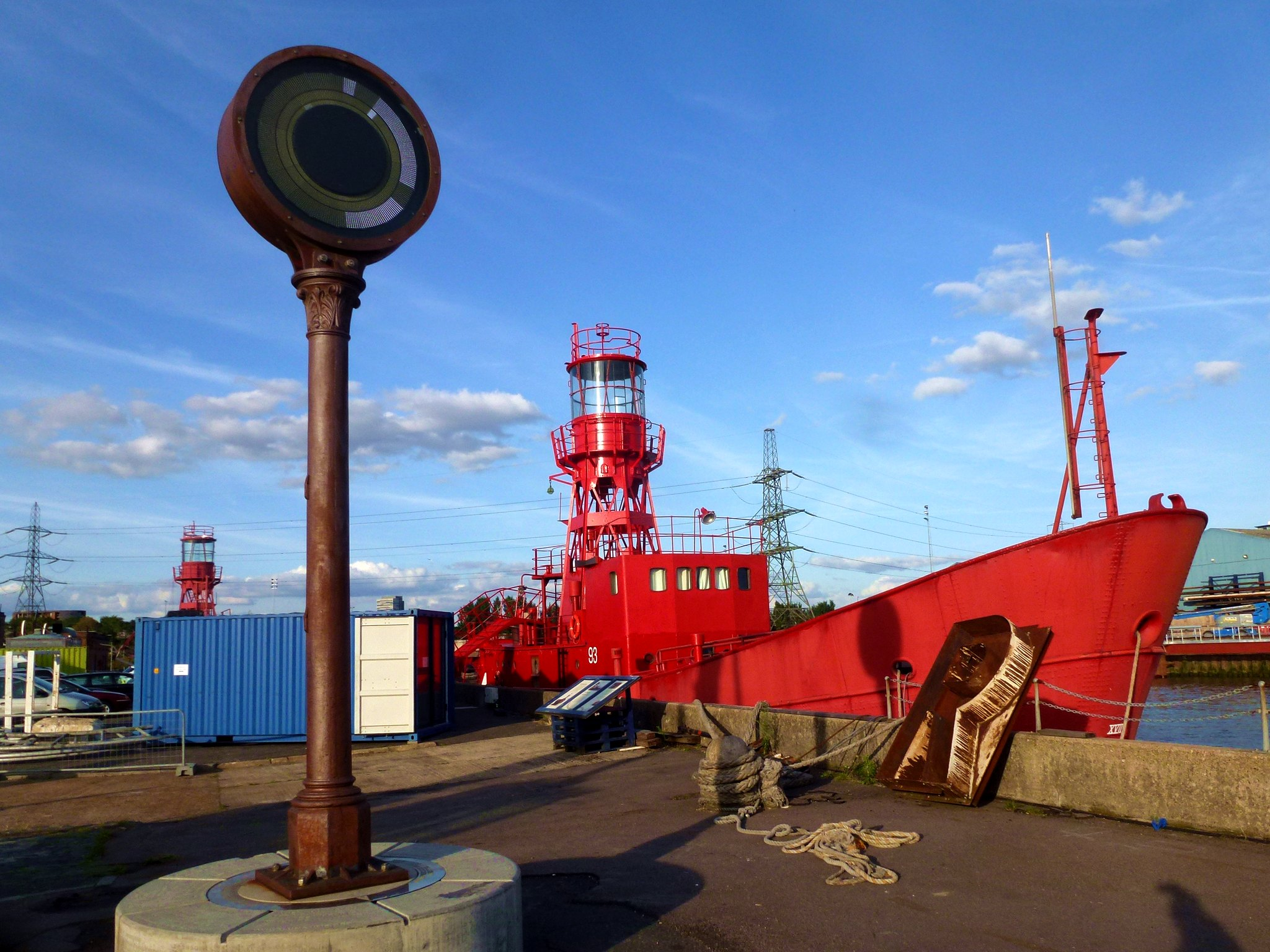
Tidal-powered lunar clock Alunatime and lightship LV93.

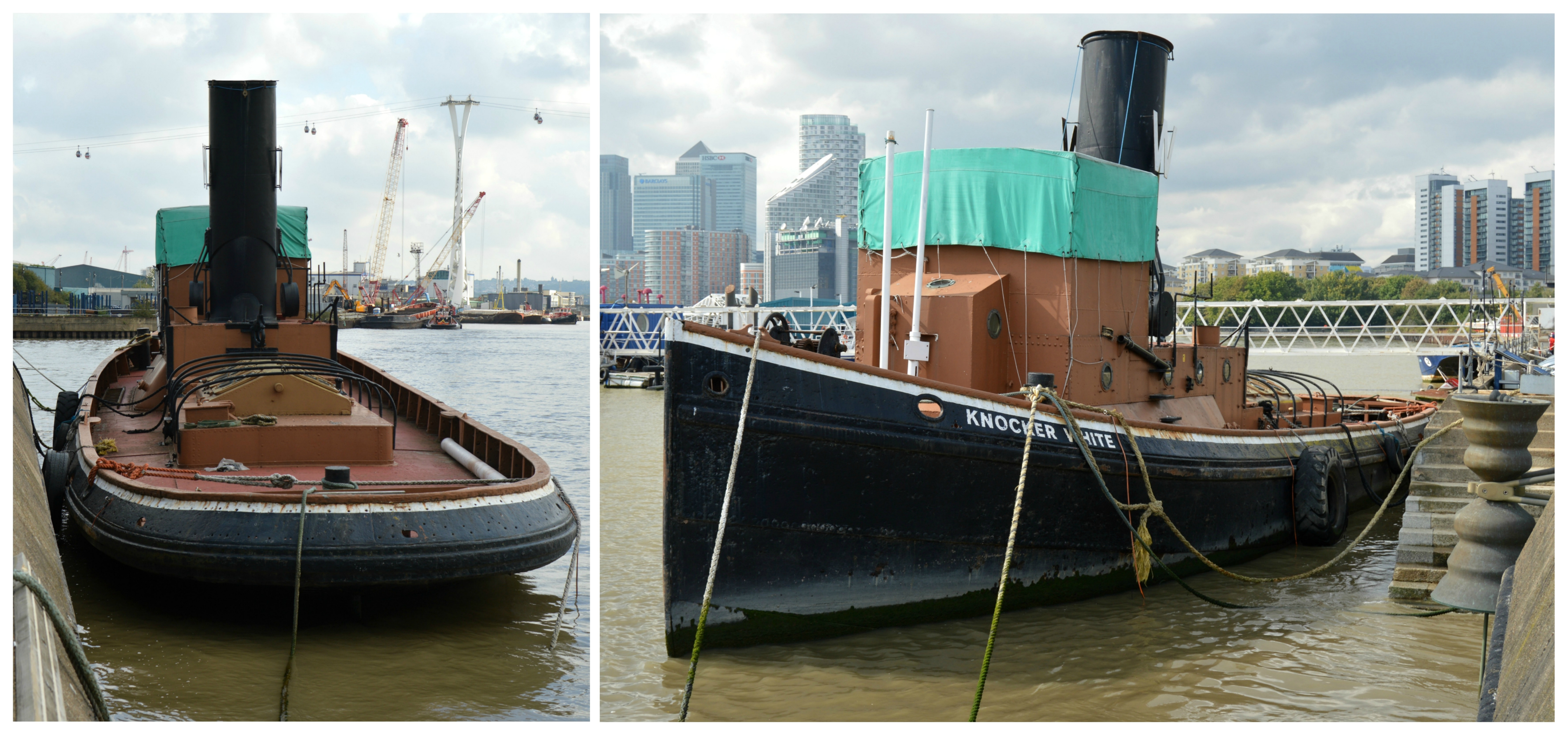
Knocker White, a Dutch-built tugboat currently preserved as a museum ship at Trinity Buoy Wharf.

== See also ==
- List of lighthouses in England
- Trinity Buoy Wharf Drawing Prize
