= Longplayer =

Musical composition of 1000 years duration

- by Jem Finer
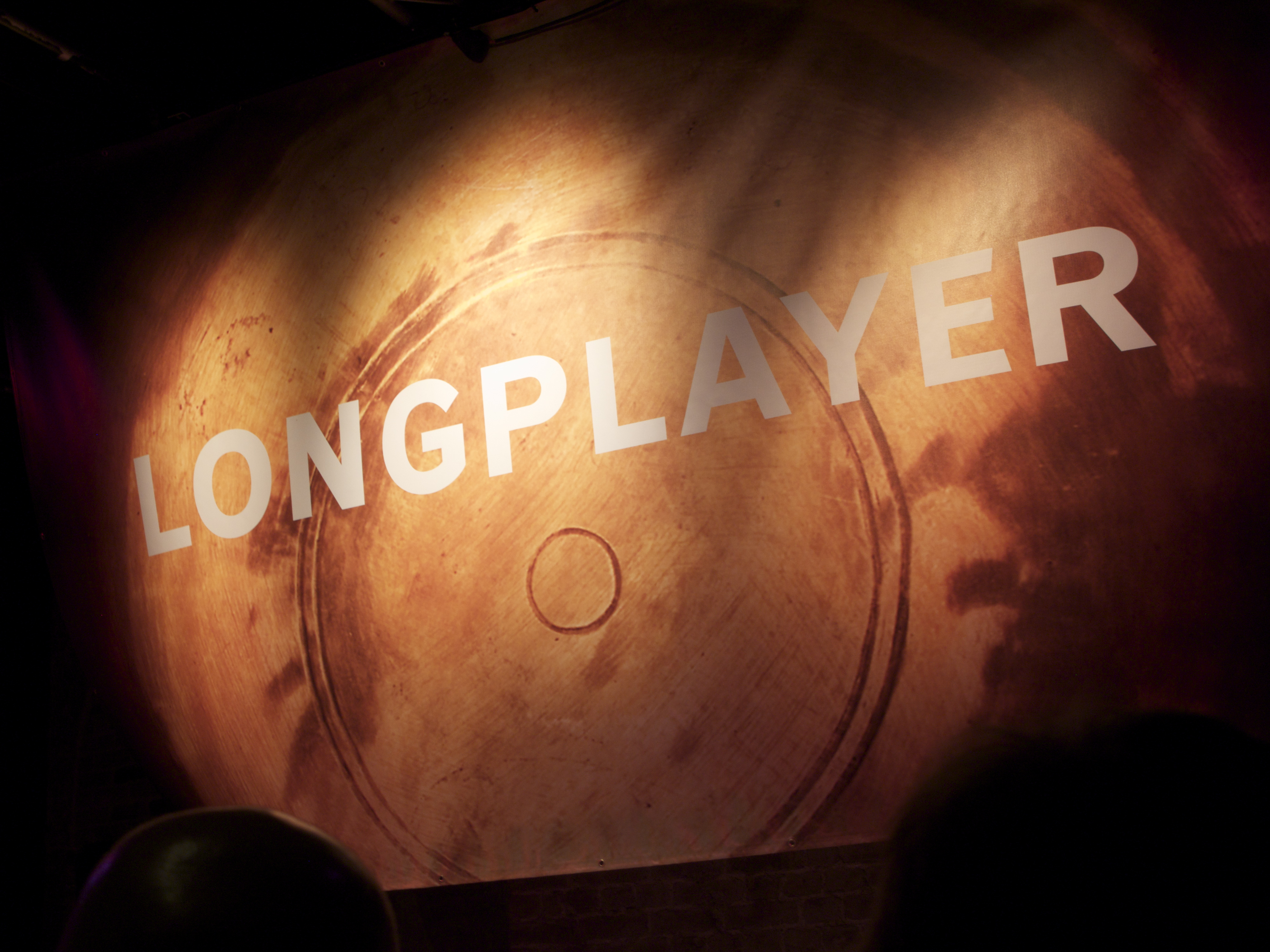
- Genre: Experimental music
- Form: Atonal
- Performed: 31 December 1999
- Duration: 1,000 years

Longplayer is a musical composition made by British composer and musician Jem Finer which is composed to play for 1,000 years without looping. It started to play at midnight on 31 December 1999, and is expected to continue without repetition until 31 December 2999.

Longplayer is not tied to any one form of technology and can be performed equally by computer or humans playing singing bowls and following a graphic score. There have also been several live performances and future performances continue to be planned. It began as an original commission by arts organisation Artangel and is currently maintained by the Longplayer Trust, and is located in Trinity Buoy Wharf on the north bank of the River Thames.

== History ==
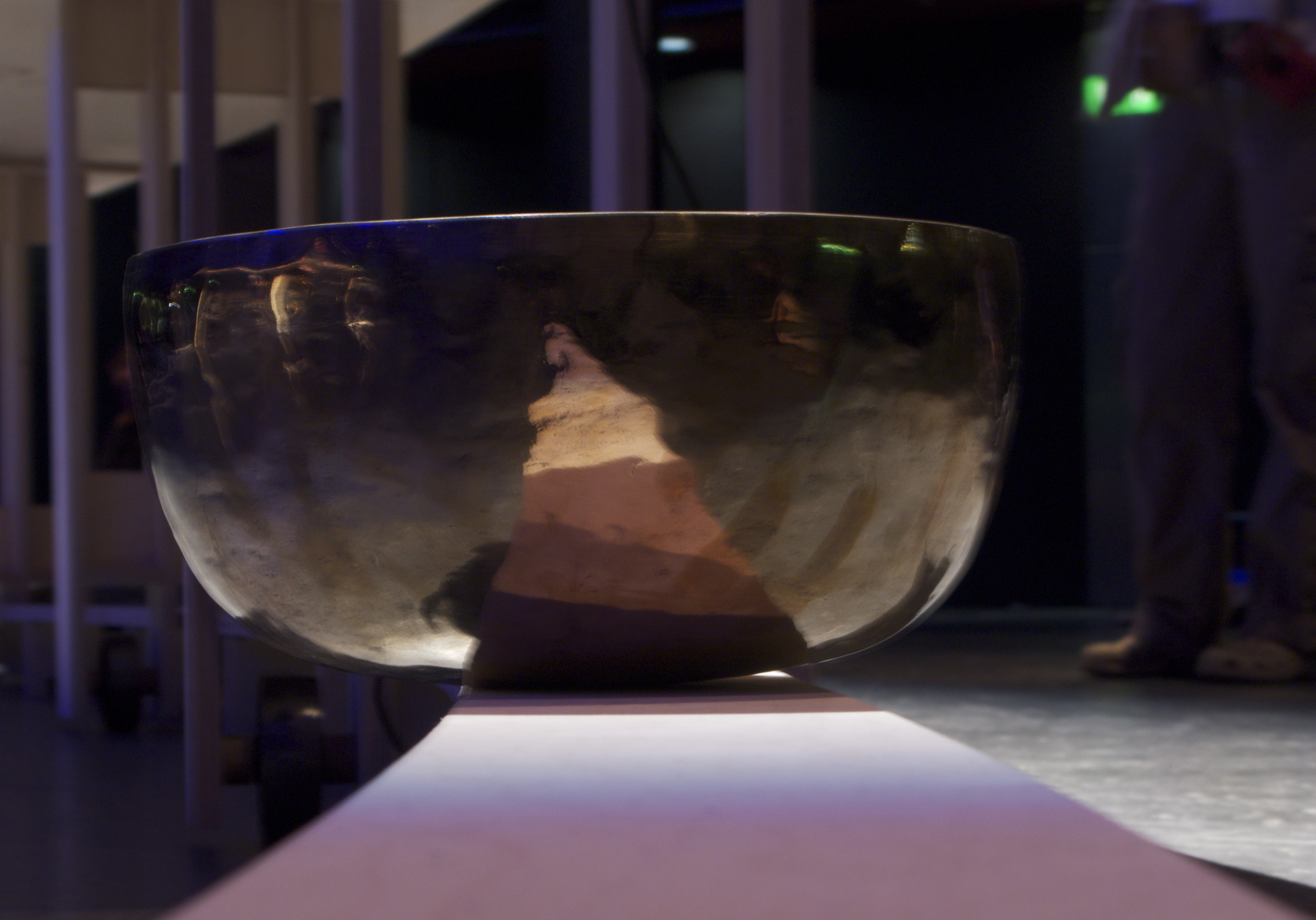
Tibetan singing bowl used at a live performance of Longplayer

Longplayer is based on an existing piece of music, 20 minutes and 20 seconds in length, which is processed by computer using a simple algorithm. This gives a large number of variations, which, when played consecutively, gives a total expected runtime of 1,000 years. It is played on a single instrument consisting of 234 Tibetan standing bells and gongs of different sizes, which are able to create a range of sounds by either striking or rolling pieces of wood around the rims. This source music was recorded in December 1999. The piece is described as reflecting on the concepts of time and impermanence from a cosmological and philosophical perspective, and questions traditional ideas about composition sound, time and duration.

The piece was the conclusion of several years' study into musical systems by Finer and is written as a self-generating computer programme. According to Finer, the idea first came to him on the back of a tour bus whilst he was a musician in the folk band The Pogues. He began working on the programming in 1995, for which he learned several computer programming languages before finally settling on SuperCollider, a language which uses algorithms to organise notation, data or MIDI to compose music, sometimes known as algorithmic composition. The programme is regularly transferred from one motherboard to another in order that the software remains continuously viable. As of 2015 this was operated by a wall of Apple computers in the Bow Creek Lighthouse. The music is produced by simple mechanical processes, and Tibetan bowls were decided on partly because of their relative robustness and ability to stay in tune without frequent retuning and partly because they have a long musical tradition stretching back over a thousand years and would not sound fixed to a particular musical fashion in history and become dated.

== Listening and performances ==
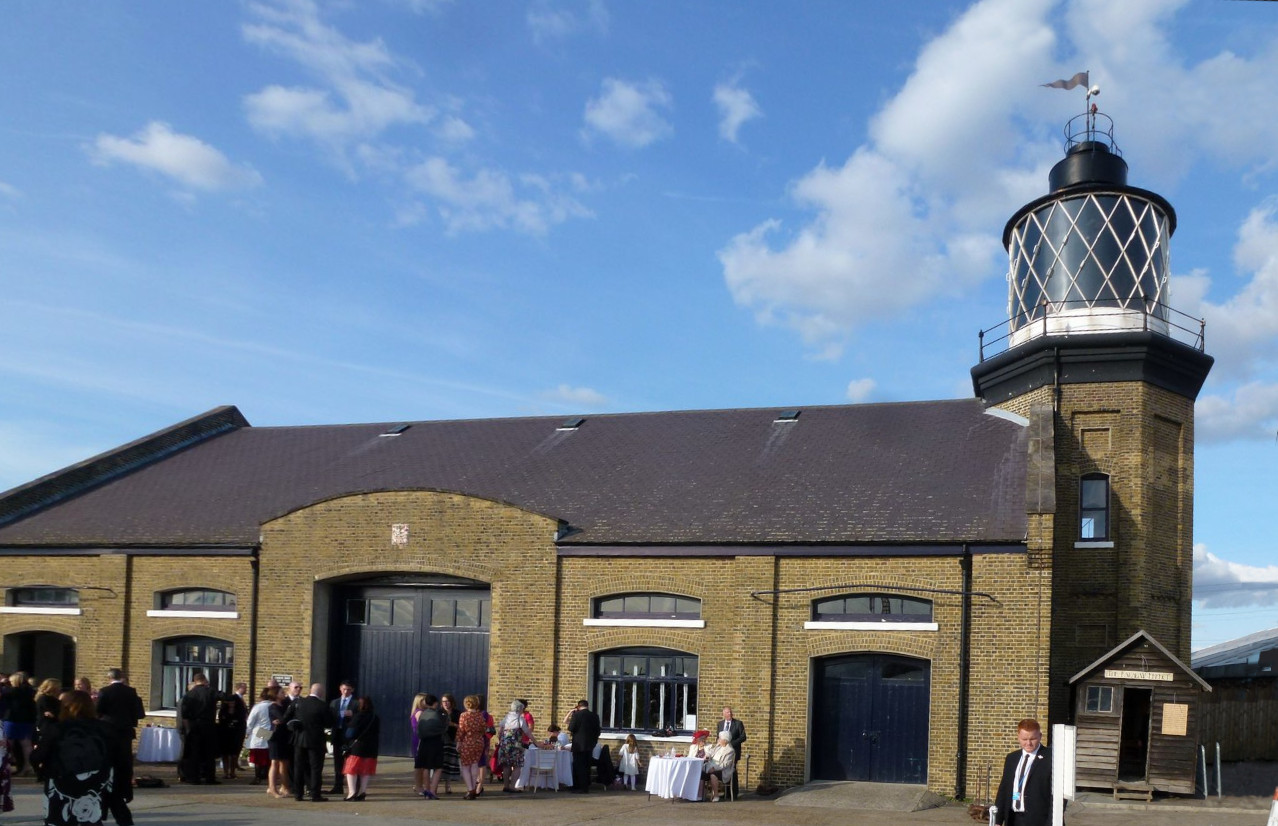
One of the listening posts, Bow Creek Lighthouse

Longplayer could be heard in the relaxation zone of the Millennium Dome in London during its year of opening in 1999. The piece was also played in the 19th century lighthouse at Trinity Buoy Wharf and other public listening posts in the United Kingdom including the Yorkshire Sculpture Park, Horniman Museum and Kings Place and in the United States, Australia and Egypt. It can also be heard via a stream on Icecast.

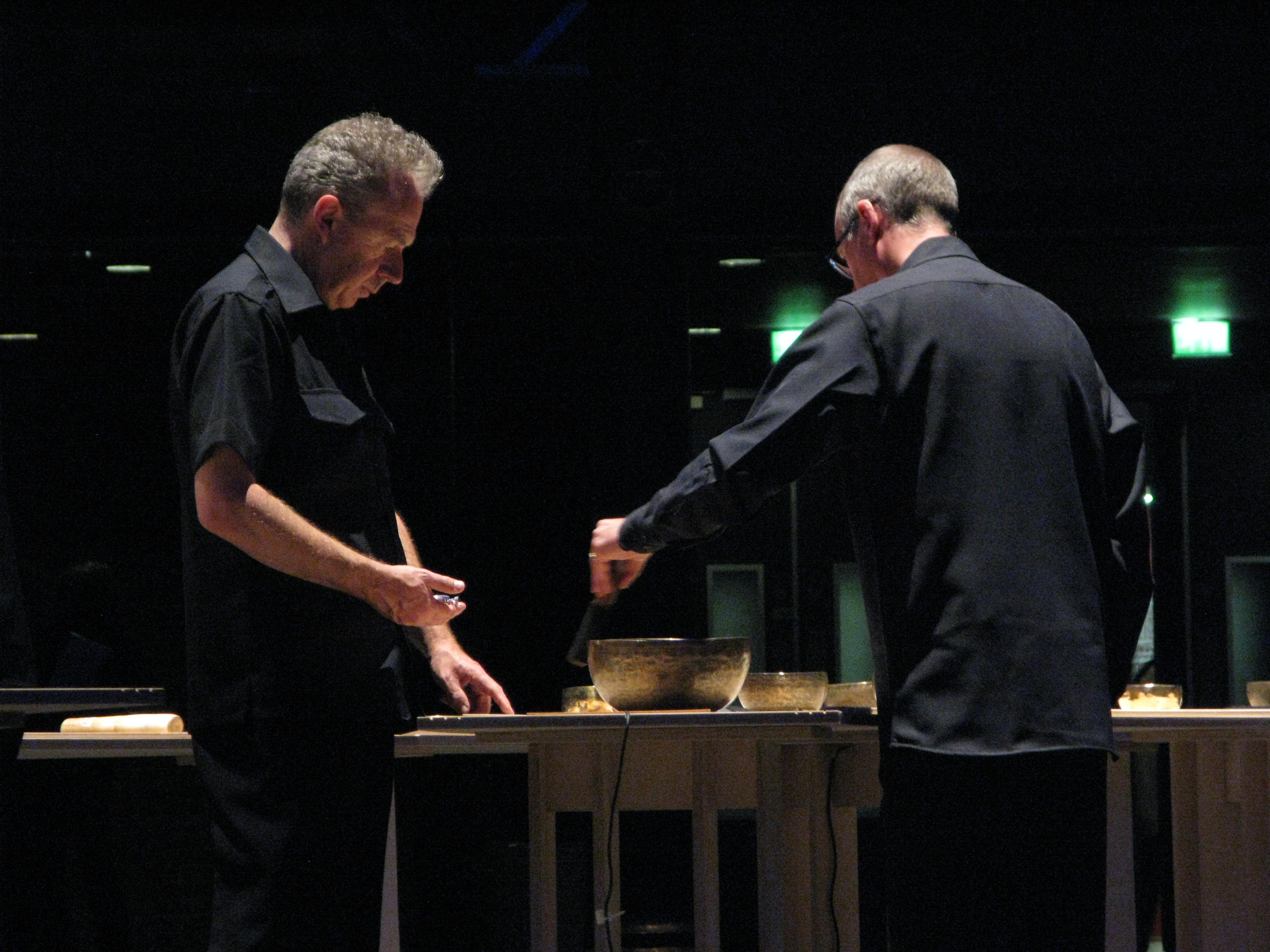
Jem Finer and David Toop at the Roundhouse

In 2009, a 1000-minute part of the piece was performed with a 26-piece orchestra on a purpose-built stage at the Roundhouse, a former railway turntable building converted to a performing arts venue in Chalk Farm, London. Performers included David Toop and Ansuman Biswas, and the piece was played on what Finer described as a "giant synthesiser built of bronze-age technology." Musicians played in shifts in groups of 6, beginning at 08:20 BST with the performance lasting 16 hours and 40 minutes.

The piece is also available as an app for mobile devices, designed by Joe Hales and Daniel Jones, which runs independently of the piece being broadcast but is exactly in synchronised performance with it.

Four excerpts of Longplayer were released on vinyl LP which accompany a book of the same name written by Finer, along with essays by Kodwo Eshun, Janna Levin, and Margaret and Christine Wertheim.

== See also ==
- As Slow as Possible
- Clock of the Long Now
- Future Library
- 100 Years
