= 2026 in Mauritius =

The following lists events that happened during 2026 in Mauritius.

== Incumbents ==
- Chief of State: President, Dharam Gokhool
  - Deputy: Vice President, Robert Hungley
- Head of Government: Prime Minister, Navin Ramgoolam
  - Deputy: Deputy Prime Minister, Paul Berenger

== Events ==
- 27 February – Mauritius breaks diplomatic relations with the Maldives following the Chagos dispute.
- 26 March – Mauritius announces measures restricting electricity consumption due to the international energy crisis.
- 26 September – Spirit World Productions, an Israeli tourism company, announces a flight cancellation from Ben Gurion Airport as a result of local authorities refusing to let it land due to political-diplomatic reasons.
- 13 October – 2026 Mauritian riots: Prime Minister Ramgoolam announces an overnight curfew from 8:30 p.m. to 6:00 a.m. covering mainly Port Louis, following unrest over the police shooting of Élodie Thomas.

== Holidays ==
Date	Holiday
1 January; 2 January	New Year's Day
1 February	Abolition of Slavery
1 February	Thaipoosam Cavadee
15 February	Maha Shivaratri
17 February	Chinese New Year
12 March	National Day
19 March	Ugadi
21 March	Eid al-Fitr (**Depends on the visibility of the moon)
1 May	Labour Day
15 August	Assumption of the Blessed Virgin Mary
15 September	Ganesh Chaturthi
2 November	Arrival of Indentured Labourers
8 November	Diwali
9 November	Public holiday following Diwali
25 December	Christmas Day

== Deaths ==
- 27 April – Abu Kasenally, 84, MP (2005–2014).
