= Pakistan Vision 2025 =

Set of goals from the Pakistani government

Flag of Pakistan

Pakistan Vision 2025 is a set of goals for social, economic, security, and governance developments outlined by the government of the Islamic Republic of Pakistan to be achieved by 2025. The overall goal is for Pakistan to become an upper-middle income country by 2025 and to eventually become one of the top ten economies in the world by 2047 (its centennial).

== 25 goals ==
The government of Pakistan outlined 25 specific goals they want to achieve by 2025, grouped into seven categories.

=== Human and social capital ===
==== Increase primary school enrollment and completion rate to 100% and literacy rate to 90% ====
The literacy rate was 72% in 2022.

==== Equalize gender parity in primary and secondary education; increase female workforce participation to 85% ====
Pakistan's GPI was 0.88 in 2019.

==== Reduce infant mortality to 4% and maternal mortality to 14% ====
Infant mortality was 5.3% in 2021; maternal mortality was 0.15% in 2020.

==== Become world champion in two sports and win 25 medals in the asian games ====
Pakistan had 207 total medals after the 2022 Asian Games.

=== Sustained growth ===
==== Become one of the largest 25 economies in the world ====
Pakistan had the 40th highest GDP in the world in 2025 according to the IMF.

=== Governance ===
==== Be in the 50th percentile for political stability, control of corruption, as measured by the world bank ====
In 2022, Pakistan was in the 7th percentile for political stability, and 23rd for control of corruption.

=== Energy, water, food ===
==== Reduce food insecure population to 30% ====
In 2025, 18.7% of Pakistanis faced food insecurity.

=== Private sector ===
==== Rank in top 50 for ease of doing business according to the world bank ====
In 2019, Pakistan ranked 108th out of 190.

=== Knowledge ===
==== Rank in top 75 in wef's global competitiveness report ====
In 2019, Pakistan was 110th.

==== Increase number of tourists to 2 million ====
Pakistan had 1.91 million international tourists in 2022.

== See also ==
- Family planning in Pakistan
