= 2025 in Mauritius =

The following lists events that happened during 2025 in Mauritius.

== Incumbents ==
- Chief of State: President, Dharam Gokhool
  - Deputy: Vice President, Robert Hungley
- Head of Government: Prime Minister, Navin Ramgoolam
  - Deputy: Deputy Prime Minister, Paul Berenger

== Events ==
- 16 February – Former Prime Minister Pravind Jugnauth is arrested for money laundering. He is released later after posting bail.
- 26 February – Sir Seewoosagur Ramgoolam International Airport is closed after the Mauritius Meteorological Services issues a category 3 cyclone warning for Tropical Storm Garance.
- 9 April – Former finance minister Renganaden Padayachy is arrested on charges of embezzlement.
- 22 May – The transfer of the Chagos Islands from the United Kingdom to Mauritius is suspended after the UK's High Court of Justice grants "interim relief" to two Chagossian women who had brought a case against the UK Foreign Office. The transfer pushes through later in the day after the injunction is lifted by the court.
- 29 June – Authorities detain a 6-year-old British boy at Sir Seewoosagur Ramgoolam International Airport after discovering 14 kg (31 lb) of cannabis in his suitcase.
- 15 September - Journalist Narain Jasodanand is arrested by police, following a complaint made by Tevin Sithanen (Rama Sithanen's son) related to an emerging scandal involving Aditi Boolell, Menlo Park, Bank of Mauritius (BOM) and Mauritius Investment Corporation (MIC).
- 30 September - Rama Sithanen, Governor of the Bank of Mauritius and president of the Financial Services Commission (FSC), resigns following the Menlo Park-MIC-BOM scandal
- 24 October – The Financial Crimes Commission arrests Mamy Ravatomanga, aide to former Madagascan president Andry Rajoelina, on suspicion of laundering 7.3 billion Mauritian rupees.

== Holidays ==
Date	Holiday
1 January; 2 January	New Year's Day
29 January	Chinese New Year
1 February	Abolition of Slavery
11 February	Thaipoosam Cavadee
26 February	Maha Shivaratri
12 March	National Day
30 March	Ugadi
31 March	Eid al-Fitr (**Depends on the visibility of the moon)
1 May	Labour Day
28 August	Ganesh Chaturthi
20 October	Diwali
1 November	All Saints' Day
2 November	Arrival of Indentured Labourers
25 December	Christmas Day

== Deaths ==
- 21 June: Kailash Purryag, 77, president (2012–2015), speaker of the National Assembly (2005–2012), and deputy prime minister (1997–2000).
- 1 November: Eddy Boissézon, 73, vice-president (2019–2024).
