= 2030s =

Upcoming decade of the Gregorian calendar (2030–2039)

The 2030s is the upcoming decade that will begin on 1 January 2030 and end on 31 December 2039.

== Plans and goals ==
- Targets of the goals of the United Nations' 2030 Agenda are set for 2030.
- Some climate-related goals from COP26 are for 2030:
  - The Glasgow Climate Pact aims to "[reduce] global carbon dioxide emissions by 55% by 2030 relative to the 2010 level". However, based on existing pledges the emissions in the year 2030 will be 14% higher than in 2010.
  - More than 100 countries pledged to reverse deforestation.
  - India plans to draw half of its energy requirement from renewable sources.
  - China aims to peak CO_{2} emissions before 2030.
- The 2030 Climate Target Plan of the EU aims to cut greenhouse gas emissions by at least 55% by 2030. The European Commission made proposals in July 2021 for how to achieve this goal.
- The international community, including the United Nations, World Bank and the United States, have set the goal of completely eradicating extreme poverty by 2030. Noting a significant decline in extreme poverty since 1990, the World Bank has noted that the end of extreme poverty is in sight and pledged to cut it down to at most 3% of the world's population by this time.
- The World Health Organization and UNICEF have set a goal for universal access to basic sanitation by 2030.
- The United Nations has made it a goal that Internet access and literacy will be universal by 2030.
- The World Bank has called for all countries to implement universal health care by this time.
- The Kenya Vision 2030 aims to raise the average standard of living in Kenya to middle income by 2030.
- Saudi Vision 2030
- Egypt Vision 2030
- Qatar National Vision 2030
- National Development Plan 2030
- Eritrea Vision 2030
- Sudan Vision 2030
- Kuwait Vision 2035
- Transport for London plans to make all buses electric.
- Finland plans on being a nicotineless and smokeless country by 2030.

== Expected events ==
=== 2030 ===
- 1–17 February: The 2030 Winter Olympics will be held in French Alps.
- April: Europa Clipper will arrive at Jupiter's moon Europa.
- 8 June – 21 July: The 2030 FIFA World Cup will be held in Spain, Portugal and Morocco (with anniversary match hosts Uruguay, Argentina and Paraguay).
- 24 July – 4 August: The 2030 Mediterranean Games are expected to take place in Pristina, Kosovo.
- The 2030 World Expo will be held in Saudi Arabia in its capital city of Riyadh.
- In Paris, France, the Centre Pompidou is expected to open after renovations starting in September 2025.

=== 2031 ===
- NASA plans to deorbit the International Space Station in January this year, directing any unbroken remnants into Point Nemo in the South Pacific Ocean.
- In Los Angeles, California, United States, Metro Los Angeles will open the East San Fernando Valley Transit Corridor light rail line in the San Fernando valley, making the valley's first light rail line since the last Pacific Electric Red Car left the valley in 1952.
- The 2031 Rugby World Cup will be held in the United States.
- The 2031 FIFA Women's World Cup will be held in Costa Rica, Jamaica, Mexico, and the United States.
- The 2031 Cricket World Cup will be held in India.
- The XXII Pan American Games will be held.
- The Jupiter Icy Moons Explorer (JUICE) will reach the Jovian system.
- In Kazakhstan, the switch of the writing script of the Kazakh language from the Cyrillic alphabet to the Latin alphabet is scheduled to be fully implemented by 2031.
- The Universal United Kingdom theme park is scheduled to open (subject to planning approvals).

=== 2032 ===
- 23 July – 8 August: The 2032 Summer Olympics is expected to take place in Brisbane, Queensland, Australia.
- June–July: Turkey and Italy will co-host the UEFA Euro 2032.
- 22 December: The asteroid 2024 YR4 which once had an impact rating of 3 on the Torino scale will pass by Earth.

=== 2033 ===
- Banks will cease issuing Mastercard credit and debit cards with a magnetic stripe.
- The 2033 Women's Rugby World Cup will be held in the United States.

=== 2034 ===
- 10–26 February: The 2034 Winter Olympics is scheduled to be held in Salt Lake City, Utah, in the United States.
- The 2034 FIFA World Cup is set to be held in Saudi Arabia.
- Dragonfly is expected to land on Saturn's moon of Titan.
- End of the project Northern Link (MTR), a rapid transit line in Hong Kong.
- The city of Rochester, New York, will turn 200 and intends to complete its fourth comprehensive plan called "Rochester 2034".

=== 2035 ===
- A fully fault-tolerant quantum computer is expected.
- New petrol and diesel cars will be banned from sale in the United Kingdom and European Union.
- ITER is expected to achieve full fusion in 2035.
- The 2035 FIFA Women's World Cup will be held in the United Kingdom.
- All regions of the Lower Volga, southern Western Siberia and part of the Far East will experience a shortage of water resources for agriculture.
- End of the project Pakistan Vision 2035, the successor to Pakistan Vision 2025 aimed at attaining regional and global leadership in its target sectors.
- Voyager 2 will become the second-ever human-made spacecraft to reach a distance of 1 light-day from Earth.

=== 2036 ===
- The United States military's lease on the island of Diego Garcia, part of the British Indian Ocean Territory, will expire if it is not renewed.
- The 2036 Summer Olympics will be held.
- One of the METI messages Cosmic Call 2 sent from the 70-meter Eupatoria Planetary Radar in 2003 arrives at its destination, the Gliese 49 system.

=== 2037 ===
- The Oxford English Dictionary is expected to publish its completed revised third edition.
- 10 July: The Apollo 10 lunar module, "Snoopy", will make a 4 million mile close approach to Earth.

=== 2038 ===
- 19 January: At 03:14:07 UTC, computer systems recording time with signed 32-bit Unix time will report the date as being 13 December 1901, due to the year 2038 problem.
- 25 April: Latest possible date for Easter, last occurred 1943.
- The 2038 FIFA World Cup is set to be held, the location of which has not been determined.

=== 2039 ===
- 2 September: The destroyers-for-bases deal's 99-year rent-free leases to the United States by the United Kingdom will expire.
- Commemorations of the centenary of World War II will begin this year, continuing through 2045.

== See also ==
- List of decades, centuries, and millennia
