= Self-referencing doomsday argument rebuttal =

Attempt to refute the doomsday argument

The self-referencing doomsday argument rebuttal is an attempt to refute the doomsday argument (that there is a credible link between the brevity of the human race's existence and its expected extinction) by applying the same reasoning to the lifetime of the doomsday argument itself.

The first researchers to write about this were P. T. Landsberg and J. N. Dewynne in 1997; they applied belief in the doomsday argument to itself, and claimed that a paradox results.

== The paradox ==
If the doomsday argument's lifetime is governed by the principle of indifference and the Copernican principle then based on the length of its current existence, and assuming that it is randomly drawn from a reference class of probabilistic speculations it is 95% certain that it will be refuted before the year 2500.

If the doomsday argument is not itself subject to these principles then its assumption that the human race's survival-time can be modeled using them appears to be a paradox (to Lansberg & Dewynne).

Alternatively, if the doomsday argument is subject to these presumptions, then as it is expected to expire (be refuted) earlier that its own prediction for the likely survival time of humanity there is a second paradox: The predictions of a theory concerning events to occur after it has been refuted (such as human extinction) are not logically meaningful. Conversely, if the doomsday argument survives until the end of human civilization (in the year 5000, say) then it will have dramatically beaten the odds against the expectations of the Copernican principle. This can create a paradox for an argument based on probability, as shown if future scenarios are broken into three groups:

1. Human extinction occurs before the year 2,500 AD.
2. Human extinction occurs after the year 2,500 AD and the doomsday argument is never refuted.
3. Human extinction occurs after the year 2,500 AD but not before the doomsday argument is refuted.

The "quick extinction" in possibility 1 is considered fairly likely in those doomsday arguments using the number of births as a reference class, but comparing like-for-like we should compare the length of time the doomsday argument survives before refutation with the length of time the human race survives before extinction. Therefore, J. Richard Gott's (temporal) doomsday argument is used to calculate the probabilities of the three scenarios above:

1. According to Gott's doomsday argument it is extremely unlikely that the human race will become extinct before the year 2,500 AD, as this would make us extremely special observers; applying the indifference principle to the duration of the human race makes the odds around 400:1 against (0.25% chance).
2. If the Copernican principle applies to the lifetime of theories as well as species (depending on the reference class evidence says it does) then the chance of the (relatively young) doomsday argument surviving sustained critical analysis for the next 500 years = 22/500 = 4.4%
3. By eliminating the other two outcomes we are left with the third, that the human race will survive to see the doomsday argument refuted. The chance of this = 100 - (4.4 + 0.25) = 95.35%

=== Paradoxical conclusion ===
If the doomsday argument can apply to itself it can be simultaneously right (as a probabilistic argument) and probably wrong (as a prediction).

Therefore, Landsberg and Dewynne argue that it is more likely that the doomsday argument is wrong (even if its logic is correct) than that the human race will become extinct in 9,000 years (which the doomsday argument calculates at around 95% likely). The interesting paradox is that the Doomsday argument is probably wrong even assuming it to be completely right (in its 95% estimate).

== Extensions ==
In 2001 Bradley Monton and Sherrilyn Roush extended this by arguing that Gott's doomsday argument inevitably refutes itself.

== Critique ==
This "meta"-doomsday argument application of the concept to the doomsday argument itself, requires some assumptions that are not universally accepted:

1. The hypothesis that the same reasoning can be applied to the lifetime of mathematical theories as can be applied to the survival time of a species. One difference is that evidence exists for the average "lifetime" of a scientific (falsifiable) prediction; there are libraries full of refuted, unrefuted, and forgotten papers published on mathematics.
2. The truth-value of the doomsday argument and the survival of the human race are un-correlated in the simple calculation above.
3. The concept that the doomsday argument is susceptible to refutation; if the doomsday argument is not falsifiable then there is no mechanism for refuting it, even if it is false. This would make it incomparable to mortal survival. (Landsberg & Dewynne say that the doomsday argument is a physical theory rather than a mathematical hypothesis, and that any such theory is inherently falsifiable, as "experience has shown that any theory in physics, however successful, is only an approximation to reality and will eventually be refuted and require modification.")

== Notes ==
A probable paradox reply in Nature from 23 October 1997 by Lansberg and Dewynne, to Gott's claim that their earlier use of his formula would also apply to the human survival time. (The reply also details the logic of the rebuttal.)
