= Anthropic Bias =

2002 book by Nick Bostrom

Anthropic Bias: Observation Selection Effects in Science and Philosophy
- Author: Nick Bostrom
- Language: English
- Subject: Anthropic principle
- Publisher: Routledge
- Publication date: 2002
- Media type: Print
- Pages: 240
- ISBN: 978-0415883948
- Followed by: Human Enhancement

Anthropic Bias: Observation Selection Effects in Science and Philosophy (2002) is a book by philosopher Nick Bostrom. It investigates how to reason when one suspects that evidence is biased by "observation selection effects"—when the evidence has been pre-filtered by the condition that some observer was appropriately positioned to "receive" it. This conundrum is sometimes called the "anthropic principle", "self-locating belief", or "indexical information".

The book first discusses the fine-tuned universe hypothesis and its possible explanations, notably considering the possibility of a multiverse. Bostrom argues against the self-indication assumption (SIA), a term he uses to characterize some existing views, and introduces the self-sampling assumption (SSA). He later refines SSA into the strong self-sampling assumption (SSSA), which uses observer-moments instead of observers to address certain paradoxes in anthropic reasoning.

== Self-sampling assumption ==
The self-sampling assumption (SSA) states that:

All other things equal, an observer should reason as if they are randomly selected from the set of all actually existent observers (past, present and future) in their reference class.

For instance, if there is a coin flip that on heads will create one observer and on tails will create two, then we have two possible worlds, one with one observer and one with two. These worlds are equally probable, so the SSA probability of being the first (and only) observer in the heads world is 1 /2, that of being the first observer in the tails world is 1 /2 × 1 /2 = 1 /4, and the probability of being the second observer in the tails world is also 1 /4.

This is why SSA gives an answer of 1 /2 probability of heads in the Sleeping Beauty problem.

Unlike SIA, SSA is dependent on the choice of reference class. If the agents in this example were in the same reference class as a trillion others, then the probability of being in the heads world upon the agent being told they are in the Sleeping Beauty problem is ≈ 1 /3, similar to SIA.

SSA may imply the doomsday argument depending on the choice of reference class.

In Anthropic Bias, Bostrom suggests refining SSA to what he calls the strong self-sampling assumption (SSSA), which replaces "observers" in the SSA definition by "observer-moments". This coincides with the intuition that an observer who lives longer has more opportunities to experience existing, and provides flexibility to refine reference classes in certain thought experiments to avoid paradoxical conclusions.

== Self-indication assumption ==
The self-indication assumption (SIA) (Note: Nick Bostrom originally used the term SIA in a slightly different way. What is here referred to as SIA, he referred to as the combined SSA+SIA) is a philosophical principle defined in Anthropic Bias. It states that:

All other things equal, an observer should reason as if they are randomly selected from the set of all possible observers.

Note that "randomly selected" is weighted by the probability of the observers existing: under SIA you are still unlikely to be an unlikely observer, unless there are many of them.

For instance, if there is a coin flip that on heads will create one observer and on tails will create two, we have three possible observers (1st observer on heads, 1st on tails, 2nd on tails). Each has an equal probability for existence, so SIA assigns 1 /3 probability to each. Alternatively, this could be interpreted as saying there are two possible observers (1st observer on either heads or tails, 2nd observer on tails), the first existing with probability one and the second existing with probability 1 /2, so SIA assigns 2 /3 to being the first observer and 1 /3 to being the second. This is the same as in the first interpretation. This is why SIA gives an answer of 1 /3 probability of heads in the Sleeping Beauty problem.

Notice that, unlike SSA, SIA is not dependent on the choice of reference class, as long as the reference class is large enough to contain all subjectively indistinguishable observers. If the reference class is large, SIA will make it more likely, but this is compensated by the much reduced probability that the agent will be that particular agent in the larger reference class.

Although this anthropic principle was originally designed as a rebuttal to the doomsday argument (by Dennis Dieks in 1992), it has general applications in the philosophy of anthropic reasoning, and Ken Olum has suggested its importance to the analysis of quantum cosmology.

Bostrom argued against the SIA, as it would allow purely a priori reasoning to settle the scientific question of whether the universe is infinite/open rather than finite/closed.

Olum has written in defense of the SIA. Nick Bostrom and Milan Ćirković have critiqued his defense.

Matthew Adelstein has also defended the SIA, arguing that all alternatives imply the soundness of the doomsday argument and other even stranger conclusions.

== Reviews ==
A review by Virginia Commonwealth University said the book "deserves a place on the shelf" of those interested in these subjects.

== See also ==
- Anthropic principle
- Bayesian inference
- Self-indication assumption doomsday argument rebuttal
