= Great Filter =

Hypothesis of barriers to forming interstellar civilizations

The Great Filter is economist Robin Hanson's name for a staple of Cold War table talk: if humans seem close to being able to send packages of bacteria across the galaxy or engineer their solar system, why don't we see that other species have already done this? Like astronomer Frank Drake, Hanson laid out the chain of steps which would be required for these futurist scenarios to come true, and asked which were the most implausible. The Great Filter is the process or processes which interrupts the sequence from abiogenesis to reaching the highest levels of development on the Kardashev scale, allowing few or no species through. One implication of this argument is that the more probable it is that other life could evolve to the present stage in which humanity is, the bleaker the future chances of humanity probably are.

== History ==
The question was discussed by Enrico Fermi and colleagues in 1950, and quickly became a staple of science fiction worldbuilding. Isaac Asimov's The Gentle Vultures (1957) features aliens who have found that any species of large, competitive primates which develops sophisticated technology will fight wars and be reduced "to starving remnants in a ruined world." Fred Saberhagen's Berserkers, first published in 1963, are alien superweapons which seek out and annihilate other life, and many other writers and thinkers expected that a species like humanity would destroy itself with nuclear warfare, environmental catastrophe, or out-of-control automated systems (Dr. Strangelove from 1964 combines the first and third methods). In 1972, Freeman Dyson warned that von Neumann replicators could become "a technological cancer spreading throughout the galaxy" and that we would be more likely to spot such poorly-behaved probes than probes which discreetly collected data and materials. In Cosmos: A Personal Voyage, Carl Sagan imagined an alien encyclopedia akin to the CIA World Factbook detecting humanity and estimating its chance of surviving until it could join the galactic federation as "less than one percent." The name comes from an online essay titled "The Great Filter – Are We Almost Past It?". The first version was written in August 1996 and the article was last updated on September 15, 1998. Hanson's formulation has received recognition in several published sources discussing the Fermi paradox and its implications.

== Main argument ==
=== Fermi paradox ===
There is no reliable evidence that aliens have visited Earth; we have observed no intelligent extraterrestrial life with current technology, nor has SETI found any transmissions from other civilizations. The Universe, apart from the Earth, seems "dead"; Hanson states:

Our planet and solar system, however, don't look substantially colonized by advanced competitive life from the stars, and neither does anything else we see. To the contrary, we have had great success at explaining the behavior of our planet and solar system, nearby stars, our galaxy, and even other galaxies, via simple "dead" physical processes, rather than the complex purposeful processes of advanced life.

Life is expected to expand to fill all available niches. With technology such as self-replicating spacecraft, these niches would include neighboring star systems and even, on longer time scales which are still small compared to the age of the universe, other galaxies. Hanson notes, "If such advanced life had substantially colonized our planet, we would know it by now."

=== The Great Filter ===
With no evidence of intelligent life in places other than Earth, it appears that the process of starting with a star and ending with "advanced explosive lasting life" must be unlikely. This implies that at least one step in this process must be improbable. Hanson's list, while incomplete, describes the following nine steps in an "evolutionary path" that results in the colonization of the observable universe:

1. The right star system (including organics and potentially habitable planets)
2. Reproductive molecules (e.g. RNA)
3. Simple (prokaryotic) single-cell life
4. Complex (eukaryotic) single-cell life
5. Sexual reproduction
6. Multi-cell life
7. Tool-using animals with intelligence
8. A civilization advancing toward the potential for a colonization explosion
9. Colonization explosion

According to the Great Filter hypothesis, at least one of these steps—if the list were complete—must be improbable. If it is not an early step (i.e., in the past), then the implication is that the improbable step lies in the future and humanity's prospects of reaching step 9 (interstellar colonization) are still bleak. If the past steps are likely, then many civilizations would have developed to the current level of the human species. However, none appear to have made it to step 9, or the Milky Way would be full of colonies. So perhaps step 9 is the unlikely one, and the only things that appear likely to keep humanity from step 9 are some sort of catastrophe, an underestimation of the impact of procrastination as technology increasingly unburdens existence, or resource exhaustion leading to the impossibility of making the step due to consumption of the available resources (for example highly constrained energy resources). So by this argument, finding multicellular life on Mars (provided it evolved independently) would be bad news, since it would imply steps 2–6 are easy, and hence only 1, 7, 8 or 9 (or some unknown step) could be the big problem.

Although steps 1–8 have occurred on Earth, any one of these may be unlikely. If the first seven steps are necessary preconditions to calculating the likelihood (using the local environment) then an anthropically biased observer can infer nothing about the general probabilities from its (pre-determined) surroundings. Using anthropic reasoning, Brandon Carter suggested that the filter lies in our past. Put simply, he argued that if the evolutionary path leading to present-day civilization had been probable, we would have expected it to have developed eons ago.

In a 2020 paper, Jacob Haqq-Misra, Ravi Kumar Kopparapu, and Edward Schwieterman argued that current and future telescopes searching for biosignatures in the ultraviolet to near-infrared wavelengths could place upper bounds on the fraction of planets in the galaxy that host life. Meanwhile, the evolution of telescopes that can detect technosignatures at mid-infrared wavelengths could provide insights into the Great Filter. They say that if planets with technosignatures are abundant, then this can increase confidence that the Great Filter is in the past. On the other hand, if finding that life is commonplace while technosignatures are absent, then this would increase the likelihood that the Great Filter lies in the future.

Astrophysicist Matt O'Dowd has identified the eukaryogenesis (step 4) as a reasonable candidate for a great filter in the past given the increasing difficulties in finding new useful proteins for prokaryotes.

Recently, paleobiologist Olev Vinn has suggested that the great filter may exist between steps 8 and 9 due to inherited behavior patterns (IBP) that initially occur in all intelligent biological organisms. These IBPs are incompatible with conditions prevailing in technological civilizations and could inevitably lead to the self-destruction of civilization in multiple ways. Hanson noted this argument back in his original essay: the patterns of thinking which make someone think that building a Dyson sphere or sending eggs and sperm to distant star systems would be a good idea are the patterns of thinking which could easily lead to human extinction. Paradoxically, seeking to make humanity immortal by spreading it across the solar system or beyond, as in Russian Cosmism or some space advocacy, makes it more likely that we will annihilate ourselves.

In a specific formulation named the "Berserker hypothesis", a filter exists between steps 8 and 9 in which each civilization is destroyed by a lethal von Neumann probe created by a more advanced civilization.

== Responses ==
There are many alternative scenarios that might allow for the evolution of intelligent life to occur multiple times without either catastrophic self-destruction or glaringly visible evidence. These are possible resolutions to the Fermi paradox: "They do exist, but we see no evidence". Other ideas include: it is too expensive to spread physically throughout the galaxy; Earth is purposely isolated; it is dangerous to communicate and hence civilizations actively hide, among others.

Astrobiologists Dirk Schulze-Makuch and William Bains, reviewing the history of life on Earth, including convergent evolution, concluded that transitions such as oxygenic photosynthesis, the eukaryotic cell, multicellularity, and tool-using intelligence are likely to occur on any Earth-like planet given enough time. They argue that the Great Filter may be abiogenesis, the rise of technological human-level intelligence, or an inability to settle other worlds because of self-destruction or a lack of resources.

Astronomer Seth Shostak of the SETI Institute argues that one can postulate a galaxy filled with intelligent extraterrestrial civilizations that have failed to colonize Earth. Perhaps the aliens lacked the intent and purpose to colonize or depleted their resources, or maybe the galaxy is colonized but in a heterogeneous manner, or the Earth could be located in a "galactic backwater". Although absence of evidence generally is only weak evidence of absence, the absence of extraterrestrial megascale engineering projects, for example, could be attributed to the Great Filter. The lack of perceptible evidence for extraterrestrial civilizations is interpreted by some as suggesting that one of the steps leading to intelligent life is unlikely. According to Shostak:

This is, of course, a variant on the Fermi paradox: We don't see clues to widespread, large-scale engineering, and consequently we must conclude that we're alone. But the possibly flawed assumption here is when we say that highly visible construction projects are an inevitable outcome of intelligence. It could be that it's the engineering of the small, rather than the large, that is inevitable. This follows from the laws of inertia (smaller machines are faster, and require less energy to function) as well as the speed of light (small computers have faster internal communication). It may be—and this is, of course, speculation—that advanced societies are building small technology and have little incentive or need to rearrange the stars in their neighborhoods, for instance. They may prefer to build nanobots instead. It should also be kept in mind that, as Arthur C. Clarke said, truly advanced engineering would look like magic to us—or be unrecognizable altogether. By the way, we've only just begun to search for things like Dyson spheres, so we can't really rule them out.

== See also ==
- Fermi Explorer – Proposed interstellar mission
- Black swan theory – Theory of response to surprise events
- Dark forest hypothesis – Hypothesis of hidden life in space
- Doomsday argument – Doomsday scenario on human births
- Drake equation – Estimate of extraterrestrial civilizations
- Anthropic principle – Hypothesis about sapient life and the universe
- Global catastrophic risk – Hypothetical global-scale disaster risk
- Goldilocks principle – Analogy for optimal conditions
- Inverse gambler's fallacy – Formal fallacy of Bayesian inference
- Kardashev scale – Measure of a civilization's evolution
- Neocatastrophism – Hypothesis for lack of detected aliens
- Principle of mediocrity – Philosophical concept
- Quiet and loud aliens – Concept in astrobiology
- Rare Earth hypothesis – Hypothesis that planets with complex life are extremely rare
- Selection bias – Bias in a statistical analysis due to non-random selection
- The Major Transitions in Evolution – 1995 book by John Maynard Smith and Eörs Szathmáry
