= Neocatastrophism =

Hypothesis for lack of detected aliens

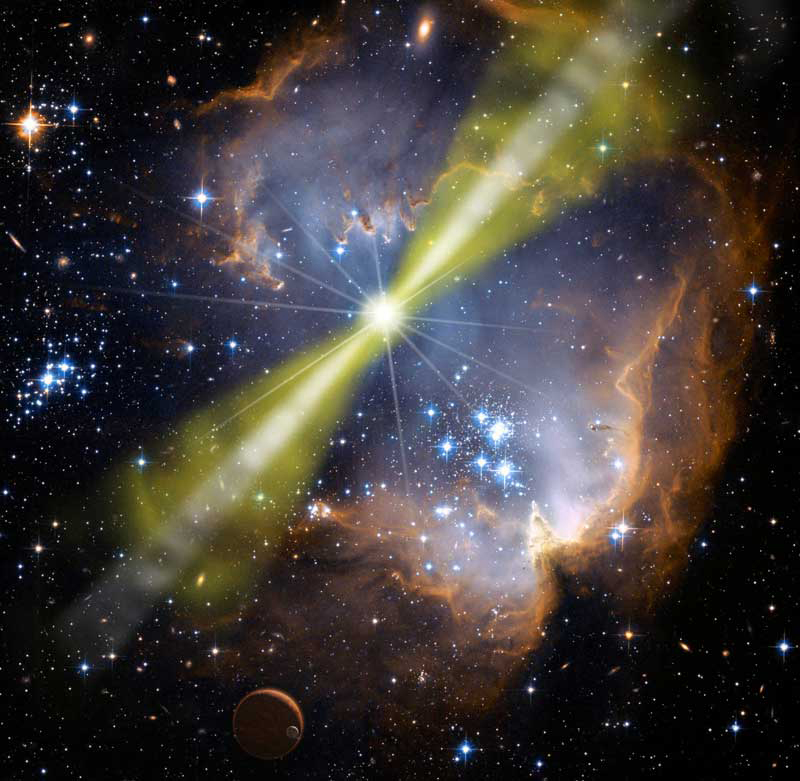
Gamma-ray bursts might have regulated the advent of intelligent life

Neocatastrophism is the hypothesis that life-exterminating events such as gamma-ray bursts have acted as a galactic regulation mechanism in the Milky Way upon the emergence of complex life in its habitable zone. It is one of several proposed solutions to the Fermi paradox since it provides a mechanism which would have delayed the advent of intelligent beings in local galaxies near Earth.

== The problem ==
It is estimated that Earth-like planets in the Milky Way started forming 9 billion years ago, and that their median age is 6.4 ± 0.7 Ga. Moreover, 75% of stars in the galactic habitable zone are older than the Sun. This makes the existence of potential planets with evolved intelligent life more likely than not to be older than that of the Earth (4.54 Ga). This creates an observational dilemma since even slower-than-lightspeed interstellar travel could in theory take only 5 to 50 million years to colonize the galaxy. This leads to a conundrum first posed in 1950 by the physicist Enrico Fermi in his namesake paradox: "Why are no aliens or their artifacts physically here?"

== The neocatastrophism resolution ==
The hypothesis posits that astrobiological evolution is subject to regulation mechanisms that arrest or postpone the advent of complex creatures capable of interstellar communication and traveling technology. These regulation mechanisms act to temporarily sterilize planets of biology in the galactic habitable zone. The main proposed regulation mechanism is gamma-ray bursts.

Part of the neocatastrophism hypothesis is that stellar evolution produces a decreasing frequency of such catastrophic events increasing the length of the "window" in which intelligent life might arise as galaxies age. According to modeling, this creates the possibility of a phase transition at which point a galaxy turns from a place that is essentially dead (with a few pockets of simple life) to one that is crowded with complex life forms.

== See also ==
- Anthropic principle
- Drake equation
- Goldilocks Principle
- Great Filter
- Mediocrity principle
- Planetary habitability
- Rare Earth hypothesis
