= Fine-tuning =

Fine-tuning may refer to:

- Fine-tuning (deep learning)
- Fine-tuning (physics)
- Fine-tuned universe

== See also ==
- Tuning (disambiguation)
