= Olev Vinn =

Estonian paleontologist (born 1971)

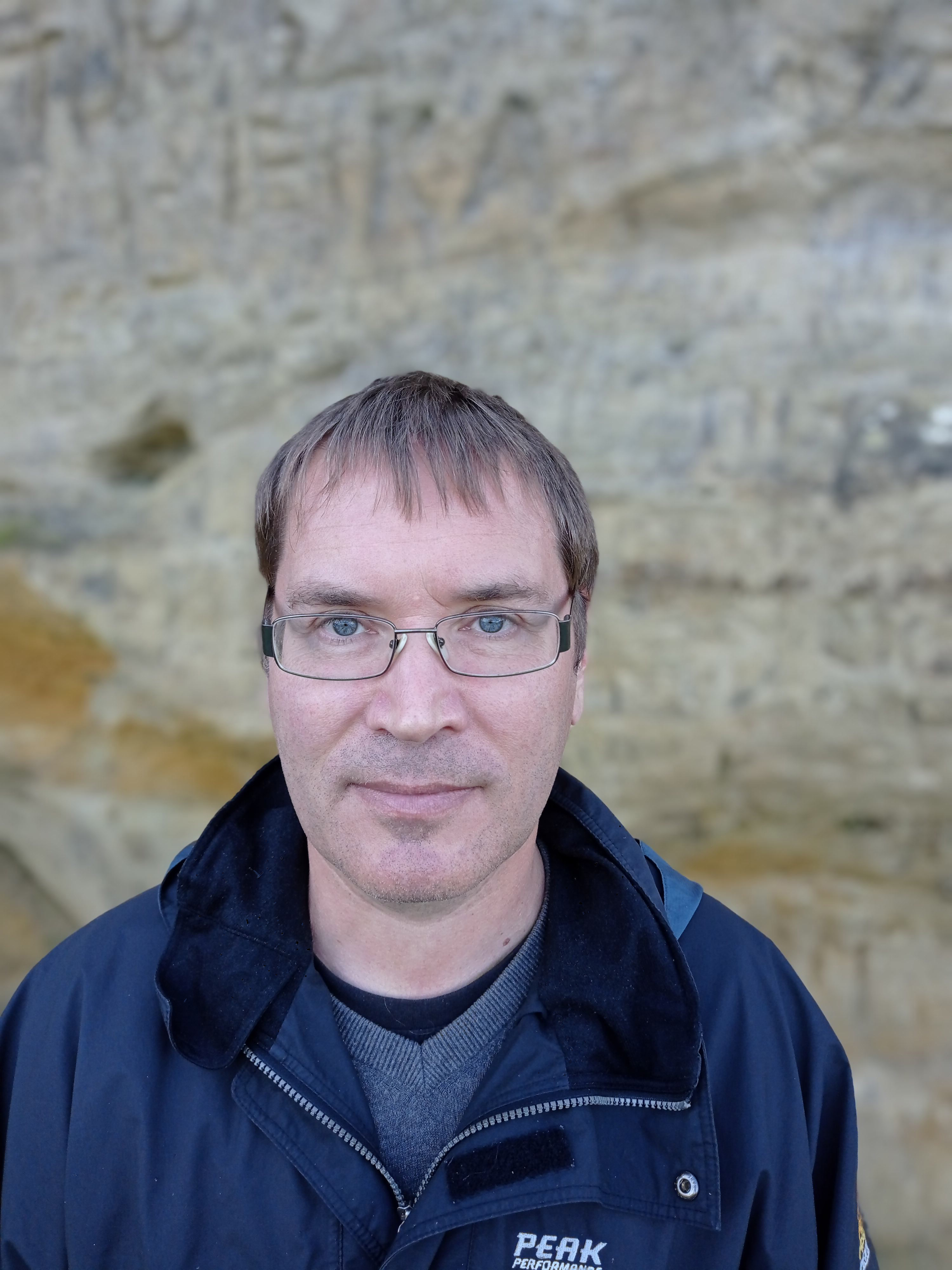
- Born: January 26, 1971; Tallinn, Estonia
- Education: University of Tartu
- Known for: studies on annelid biomineralization
- Awards: 2017 Estonian State Science Prize in Geo-Bio Sciences
- Scientific career
- Fields: paleobiology, paleontology
- Workplaces: University of Tartu
- Doctoral advisor: Madis Rubel

Olev Vinn (born January 26, 1971) is an Estonian paleobiologist and paleontologist.

== Career ==
Vinn graduated from the biology class of Tallinn 3. Secondary School in 1989. He studied geology at the University of Tartu from 1989 to 1993. Vinn holds an M.Sc. degree in paleontology and stratigraphy from the University of Tartu in 1995 and a Ph.D. degree in geology from the same university in 2001. He is a senior research fellow in paleontology at the University of Tartu since 2007. He has published more than 300 peer-reviewed papers in international scientific journals, serving as first or sole author on more than 200 of them. Since 2021, he has been an editor of the Journal of Paleontology. From 2025 onward, he has served on the editorial board of the leading geological journal Geology. In addition, he serves on the editorial boards of several other scientific journals in paleontology, biology, and geology indexed in Web of Science. Since 2021, he has been listed on the Stanford/Elsevier Top 2% Scientists List.

== Taxonomic studies ==
Vinn has described new genera and species of brachiopods, cornulitids, microconchids, serpulid polychaetes and trace fossils. He is a specialist of extinct tubicolous fossils. A microconchid species Microconchus vinni is named in honour of his taxonomic studies of tentaculitoid tubeworms.

== Biomineralization studies ==
Vinn has described the majority of the annelid skeletal ultrastructures. Oriented tube structures are present in many serpulid species and cannot be explained by the standard carbonate slurry model. Vinn and his co-authors have hypothesized that oriented structures in serpulid tubes have been secreted in the same way as in mollusc shells, based on their ultrastructural similarity. Vinn and his co-authors proposed alternative ways to explain the calcified secretory granules described by Neff in the lumen of the calcium-secreting glands in serpulids. They proposed that worm actually produces calcium-saturated mucus in the glands. The mucus is then deposited on the tube aperture, where crystallization of the structure is controlled by an organic matrix, as in molluscs. The calcified granules in the glands may only be an artifact of fixation and formed after the death of the worm.

== Paleoecology studies ==
Vinn has studied the evolution of symbiosis in several groups of early invertebrates such as cornulitids, microconchids, bryozoans, brachiopods, crinoids, stromatoporoids, tabulates and rugosans. He has described serpulid faunas of Mesozoic to Recent hydrocarbon seeps. A Late Devonian coral species ?Michelinia vinni is named in honour of his contribution to knowledge of ecology of Palaeozoic bioconstructing organisms. A crinoid species name Hiiumaacrinus vinni recognizes his significant contributions to the Silurian paleontology of Estonia.

== Astrobiology studies and SETI ==
Vinn has contributed to theoretical astrobiology and the search for extraterrestrial intelligence (SETI), focusing on the nature and detectability of life and advanced intelligence. He has hypothesized that a future morphogeometric theory of life would use the geometry and spatial organization of biological systems as fundamental characteristics for recognizing life and potentially distinguishing living systems from non-living matter. Vinn has proposed a new solution to the Fermi paradox and suggested that the Great Filter may have universal biological roots related to evolutionary animal behavior.

== Selected publications ==
- Vinn, O.; ten Hove, H.A.; Mutvei, H.; Kirsimäe, K. (2008). "Ultrastructure and mineral composition of serpulid tubes (Polychaeta, Annelida)". Zoological Journal of the Linnean Society. 154 (4): 633–650. doi:10.1111/j.1096-3642.2008.00421.x.
- Vinn, O.; Jäger, M.; Kirsimäe, K. (2008). "Microscopic evidence of serpulid affinities of the problematic fossil tube "Serpula" etalensis from the Lower Jurassic of Germany". Lethaia. 41 (4): 417–421. Bibcode:2008Letha..41..417V. doi:10.1111/j.1502-3931.2008.00093.x.
- Vinn, O (2009). "Attempted predation on Early Paleozoic cornulitids". Palaeogeography, Palaeoclimatology, Palaeoecology. 273 (1–2): 87–91. Bibcode:2009PPP...273...87V. doi:10.1016/j.palaeo.2008.12.004.
- Vinn, O (2010). "Adaptive strategies in the evolution of encrusting tentaculitoid tubeworms". Palaeogeography, Palaeoclimatology, Palaeoecology. 292 (1–2): 211–221. Bibcode:2010PPP...292..211V. doi:10.1016/j.palaeo.2010.03.046.
- Vinn, O.; ten Hove, H.A. (2011). "Microstructure and formation of the calcareous operculum in Pyrgopolon ctenactis and Spirobranchus giganteus (Annelida, Serpulidae)". Zoomorphology. 130 (3): 181–188. doi:10.1007/s00435-011-0133-0. S2CID 41765489.
- Vinn, O. and Mõtus, M.-A. 2012. Diverse early endobiotic coral symbiont assemblage from the Katian (Late Ordovician) of Baltica. Palaeogeography, Palaeoclimatology, Palaeoecology 321–322, 137–141.
- Vinn, O (2013). "On the unique isotropic aragonitic tube microstructure of some serpulids (Polychaeta, Annelida)". Journal of Morphology. 274 (4): 478–482. Bibcode:2013JMorp.274..478V. doi:10.1002/jmor.20112. PMID 23280721. S2CID 3237209.
- Vinn, O (2013). "SEM study of semi-oriented tube microstructures of Serpulidae (Polychaeta, Annelida): implications for the evolution of complex oriented microstructures". Microscopy Research and Technique. 76 (5): 453–456. doi:10.1002/jemt.22186. PMID 23408686. S2CID 28986837.
- Vinn, O (2013). "Occurrence, formation and function of organic sheets in the mineral tube structures of Serpulidae (Polychaeta, Annelida)". PLOS ONE. 8 (10) e75330. Bibcode:2013PLoSO...875330V. doi:10.1371/journal.pone.0075330. PMC 3792063. PMID 24116035.
- Vinn, O.; Kupriyanova, E.K.; Kiel, S. (2013). "Serpulids (Annelida, Polychaeta) at Cretaceous to modern hydrocarbon seeps: ecologic and evolutionary patterns". Palaeogeography, Palaeoclimatology, Palaeoecology. 390: 35–41. Bibcode:2013PPP...390...35V. doi:10.1016/j.palaeo.2012.08.003.
- Vinn, O.; Mõtus, M.-A. (2014). "Endobiotic rugosan symbionts in stromatoporoids from the Sheinwoodian (Silurian) of Baltica". PLOS ONE. 9 (2) e90197. Bibcode:2014PLoSO...990197V. doi:10.1371/journal.pone.0090197. PMC 3934990. PMID 24587277.
- Kupriyanova, E.K.; Vinn, O.; Taylor, P.D.; Schopf, J.W.; Kudryavtsev, A.; Bailey-Brock, J. (2014). "Serpulids living deep: calcareous tubeworms beyond the abyss". Deep-Sea Research Part I. 90: 91–104. Bibcode:2014DSRI...90...91K. doi:10.1016/j.dsr.2014.04.006.
- Vinn, O.; Wilson, M.A.; Mõtus, M.-A. (2014). "The earliest giant Osprioneides borings from the Sandbian (Late Ordovician) of Estonia". PLOS ONE. 9 (6) e99455. Bibcode:2014PLoSO...999455V. doi:10.1371/journal.pone.0099455. PMC 4047083. PMID 24901511.
- Vinn, O.; Wilson, M.A.; Toom, U. (2014). "Earliest rhynchonelliform brachiopod parasite from the Late Ordovician of northern Estonia (Baltica)". Palaeogeography, Palaeoclimatology, Palaeoecology. 411: 42–45. Bibcode:2014PPP...411...42V. doi:10.1016/j.palaeo.2014.06.028.
- Vinn, O.; Wilson, M.A.; Mõtus, M.-A.; Toom, U. (2014). "The earliest bryozoan parasite: Middle Ordovician (Darriwilian) of Osmussaar Island, Estonia". Palaeogeography, Palaeoclimatology, Palaeoecology. 414: 129–132. Bibcode:2014PPP...414..129V. doi:10.1016/j.palaeo.2014.08.021.
- Chan, V.; Vinn, O.; Li, C.; Lu, X.; Kudryavtsev, A.B.; Schopf, J.W.; Shih, K.; Zhang, T.; Thiyagarajan, V. (2015). "Evidence of compositional and ultrastructural shifts during the development of calcareous tubes in the biofouling tubeworm, Hydroides elegans". Journal of Structural Biology. 189 (3): 230–237. doi:10.1016/j.jsb.2015.01.004. PMID 25600412.
- Vinn, O. (2024). "Potential incompatibility of inherited behavior patterns with civilization: Implications for Fermi paradox". Science Progress. 107 (3) 00368504241272491: 1–6. doi:10.1177/00368504241272491. PMC 11307330. PMID 39105260.
- Vinn, O. (2025). "How to solve the problem of inherited behavior patterns and increase the sustainability of technological civilization". Frontiers in Psychology. 16 1562943: 1–4. doi:10.3389/fpsyg.2025.1562943. PMC 11866485. PMID 40018008.
- Vinn, O. (2025). "Technological Signatures of Super Civilizations: Gargantuan Structures and Enormous Energies or "Invisibility" Due to Low Energy Solutions to Complex Problems and Quantum Engineering". Cosmos and History. 21: 366–372.
- Vinn, O. (2026). "Is Technological Civilization the Universal Culmination of Intellectual Evolution? Implications for SETI and the far posthuman future". Cosmos and History. 22: 462–472.
- Vinn, O. (2026). "Toward a universal geometry of life: Implications for biological theory and astrobiology". Carnets Geol. 26: 151–161.
- Vinn, O.; Wilson, M.A.; Tinn, O.; Lang, L.; Isakar, M.; Toom, U. (2026). "Colonization of empty shells by cryptic fauna: a global event and important ecological innovation in Ordovician benthic ecosystems". Scientific Reports. doi:10.1038/s41598-026-62638-5.
- Vinn, O. (2026). "A universal scale for the evolution of intelligent entities of biological origin: Implications for SETI". Journal of the British Interplanetary Society. 79: 362–365. doi:10.59332/jbis-079-10-0362.
