= Weakless universe =

Hypothetical universe without weak interactions

A weakless universe is a hypothetical universe that contains no weak interactions, but is otherwise very similar to our own universe.

In particular, a weakless universe is constructed to have atomic physics and chemistry identical to standard atomic physics and chemistry. The dynamics of a weakless universe includes a period of Big Bang nucleosynthesis, star formation, stars with sufficient fuel to burn for billions of years, stellar nuclear synthesis of heavy elements and also supernovae that distribute the heavy elements into the interstellar medium.

== Motivation and anthropics ==
The strength of the weak interaction is an outstanding problem in modern particle physics. A theory should ideally explain why the weak interaction is 32 orders of magnitude stronger than gravity; this is known as the hierarchy problem. There are various models that address the hierarchy problem in a dynamical and natural way, for example, supersymmetry, technicolor, warped extra dimensions, and so on.

An alternative approach to explaining the hierarchy problem is to invoke the anthropic principle: One assumes that there are many other patches of the universe (or multiverse) in which physics is very different. In particular one can assume that the “landscape” of possible universes contains ones where the weak force has a different strength compared to our own. In such a scenario observers would presumably evolve wherever they can. If the observed strength of the weak force is then vital for the emergence of observers, this would explain why the weak force is indeed observed with this strength. Barr and others argued that if one only allows the electroweak symmetry breaking scale to vary between universes, keeping all other parameters fixed, atomic physics would change in ways that would not allow life as we know it.

Anthropic arguments have recently been boosted by the realization that string theory has many possible solutions, or vacua, called the “string landscape”, and by Steven Weinberg's prediction of the cosmological constant by anthropic reasoning.

The hypothetical universe without the weak interaction is meant to serve as a counter-example to the anthropic approach to the hierarchy problem. For this “weakless universe”, other parameters are varied as the electroweak breaking scale is changed. Indeed, string theory implies that the landscape is very big and diverse. The ostensible habitability of the weakless universe implies that anthropic reasoning alone cannot explain the hierarchy problem, unless the available vacua in the landscape are severely restricted for some other reason.

== Obstacles ==
=== Weakless stars ===
One of the biggest obstacles for a habitable weakless universe is the necessary existence of stars. Main sequence stars work through fusing two protons to deuterium as a first step, which proceeds through weak interactions. In the weakless universe of Harnik, Kribs, and Perez this is overcome by ensuring a high primordial deuterium to hydrogen ratio during Big Bang nucleosynthesis (BBN). This permits long-lived stars fueled by direct deuterium-proton burning to helium, which proceeds through strong interactions. The high initial deuterium/hydrogen ratio (~1:3 by mass) is arranged by simply reducing the overall baryon to photon ratio, which allows the BBN deuterium to be produced at a lower temperature where the Coulomb barrier protects deuterium from immediate fusion into ^{4}He.

=== Oxygen abundance ===
Another potential problem for a weakless universe is that supernova explosions are necessarily neutrinoless. The resulting efficiency of production and dispersion of heavy elements (in particular, oxygen) into the interstellar medium for subsequent incorporation into habitable planets has been questioned by Clavelli and White.

=== Baryogenesis ===
Baryogenesis and leptogenesis within the Standard Model rely on the weak interaction: For matter not to be wiped off by anti-matter at the very early universe, the universe must either have to start with a different amount of each (i.e. initial non-zero baryon number), or admit Sakharov's conditions to baryogenesis. In the latter case, there are two options:

- Baryon number conservation is broken perturbatively, so that the Lagrangian includes explicit baryon-number non-conserving interactions. In order to prevent fast proton decay, this interaction has to be with either heavy, exotic particles that are also created abundantly in the universe and interact in peculiar ways with the baryonic matter, or very weak, or both. If the particles interacting with baryons are not strongly (and/or electromagnetically) interacting themselves, the strong interaction (and/or electromagnetic interaction) has to be part of a larger, spontaneously broken, gauge symmetry.
- Baryon number conservation is broken non-perturbatively, i.e. by quantum anomaly. At least one such mechanism is chiral anomaly, which requires the existence of the weak interaction, or at least something very similar to it:
  - There has to be a chiral gauge interaction, where the fermions are in its fundamental representation.
  - In order not to be anomalous itself (as gauge interaction anomaly leads to inconsistency), the gauge group is highly restricted, with SU(2) symmetry being the only option among SU(N) groups.
  - Mass terms break chiral symmetry, so in order for baryon masses to be possible, the chiral gauge interaction has to be spontaneously broken, leading to a Higgs mechanism.
  - Since the electromagnetic and the strong gauge groups also need to be non-anomalous, this leads to additional constraints. For example, if the sum of electromagnetic charges of all quark types is positive (more generally, non-zero), then there have to be additional, negatively charged particles, coupled to the chiral gauge group, which will also be created during baryogenesis - namely, the leptons.

Harnik, Kribs, and Perez argue that the Standard Model does not explain the observed size of the baryon asymmetry either, and that their weakless universe model only focuses on the time where the asymmetry already exists.
