= Anthropic principle =

Hypothesis about sapient life and the universe

In cosmology and philosophy of science, the anthropic principle (also known as the observation selection effect) is the proposition that the range of possible observations made about a universe is limited by the fact that observations can only be made if that universe is capable of developing observers in the first place. Proponents of the anthropic principle argue that it explains why the universe has the age and the fundamental physical constants necessary to accommodate intelligent life. If either had been significantly different, no one would have been around to make observations. Anthropic reasoning has been used to address the question as to why certain measured physical constants take the values that they do, rather than some other arbitrary values, and to explain a perception that the universe appears to be finely tuned for the existence of life.

There are many different formulations of the anthropic principle. Philosopher Nick Bostrom counts thirty, but the underlying principles can be divided into "weak" and "strong" forms, depending on the types of cosmological claims they entail.

== Definition and basis ==
The principle was formulated as a response to a series of observations that the laws of nature and parameters of the universe have values that are consistent with conditions for life as it is known rather than values that would not be consistent with life on Earth. The anthropic principle states that this is an a posteriori necessity, because if life were impossible, no living entity would be there to observe it, and thus it would not be known. That is, it must be possible to observe 'some' universe, and hence, the laws and constants of any such universe must accommodate that possibility.

The term anthropic in "anthropic principle" has been argued to be a misnomer. (Note: From Greek roots, anthropic means "of or pertaining to mankind or humans".) While singling out the currently observable kind of carbon-based life, none of the finely tuned phenomena require human life or some kind of carbon chauvinism. Any form of life or any form of heavy atom, stone, star, or galaxy would do; nothing specifically human or anthropic is involved.

The anthropic principle has given rise to some confusion and controversy, partly because the phrase has been applied to several distinct ideas. All versions of the principle have been accused of discouraging the search for a deeper physical understanding of the universe. Critics of the weak anthropic principle point out that its lack of falsifiability entails that it is non-scientific and therefore inherently not useful. Stronger variants of the anthropic principle that are not tautologies can still make claims considered controversial by some; these would be contingent upon empirical verification.

== Anthropic observations ==
In 1961, Robert Dicke noted that the age of the universe, as seen by living observers, cannot be random. Instead, biological factors constrain the universe to be more or less in a "golden age", neither too young nor too old. If the universe was one tenth as old as its present age, there would not have been sufficient time to build up appreciable levels of metallicity (levels of elements besides hydrogen and helium) especially carbon, by nucleosynthesis. Small rocky planets did not yet exist. If the universe were 10 times older than it actually is, most stars would be too old to remain on the main sequence and would have turned into white dwarfs, aside from the dimmest red dwarfs, and stable planetary systems would have already come to an end. Thus, Dicke explained the coincidence between large dimensionless numbers constructed from the constants of physics and the age of the universe, a coincidence that inspired Dirac's varying-G theory.

Dicke later reasoned that the density of matter in the universe must be almost exactly the critical density needed to prevent the Big Crunch (the "Dicke coincidences" argument). The most recent measurements may suggest that the observed density of baryonic matter, and some theoretical predictions of the amount of dark matter, account for about 30% of this critical density, with the rest contributed by a cosmological constant. Steven Weinberg gave an anthropic explanation for this fact: he noted that the cosmological constant has a remarkably low value, some 120 orders of magnitude smaller than the value particle physics predicts (this has been described as the "worst prediction in physics"). However, if the cosmological constant were several orders of magnitude larger than its observed value, the universe would suffer catastrophic inflation, which would preclude the formation of stars, and hence life.

The observed values of the dimensionless physical constants (such as the fine-structure constant) governing the four fundamental interactions are balanced as if fine-tuned to permit the formation of commonly found matter and subsequently the emergence of life. A slight increase in the strong interaction (up to 50% for some authors) would bind the dineutron and the diproton and convert all hydrogen in the early universe to helium; likewise, an increase in the weak interaction also would convert all hydrogen to helium. Water, as well as sufficiently long-lived stable stars, both essential for the emergence of life as it is known, would not exist. More generally, small changes in the relative strengths of the four fundamental interactions can greatly affect the universe's age, structure, and capacity for life.

== Origin ==
The phrase "anthropic principle" first appeared in Brandon Carter's contribution to a 1973 Kraków symposium. Carter, a theoretical astrophysicist, articulated the anthropic principle in reaction to the Copernican principle, which states that humans do not occupy a privileged position in the Universe. Carter said: "Although our situation is not necessarily central, it is inevitably privileged to some extent." Specifically, Carter disagreed with using the Copernican principle to justify the Perfect Cosmological Principle, which states that all large regions and times in the universe must be statistically identical. The latter principle underlies the steady-state theory, which had recently been falsified by the 1965 discovery of the cosmic microwave background radiation. This discovery was unequivocal evidence that the universe has changed radically over time (for example, via the Big Bang).

Carter defined two forms of the anthropic principle, a "weak" one that referred only to anthropic selection of privileged spacetime locations in the universe, and a more controversial "strong" form that addressed the values of the fundamental constants of physics.

Since Carter's 1973 paper, the term anthropic principle has been extended to cover a number of ideas that differ in important ways from his. Particular confusion was caused by the 1986 book The Anthropic Cosmological Principle by John D. Barrow and Frank Tipler, which distinguished between a "weak" and "strong" anthropic principle in a way different from Carter's, as discussed in the next section.

Carter was not the first to invoke some form of the anthropic principle. Ludwig Boltzmann may have been one of the first in modern science to use anthropic reasoning. Prior to knowledge of the Big Bang, Boltzmann's thermodynamic concepts painted a picture of a universe that had inexplicably low entropy. Boltzmann suggested several explanations, one of which relied on fluctuations that could produce pockets of low entropy or Boltzmann universes. While most of the universe is featureless in this model, to Boltzmann, it is unremarkable that humanity happens to inhabit a Boltzmann universe, as that is the only place that could develop and support intelligent life.

The evolutionary biologist Alfred Russel Wallace anticipated the anthropic principle as long ago as 1904: "Such a vast and complex universe as that which we know exists around us, may have been absolutely required [...] in order to produce a world that should be precisely adapted in every detail for the orderly development of life culminating in man."

In 1957, Robert Dicke wrote: "The age of the Universe 'now' is not random but conditioned by biological factors [...] [changes in the values of the fundamental constants of physics] would preclude the existence of man to consider the problem."

== Variants ==
According to Brandon Carter, the weak anthropic principle (WAP) states that "... our location in the universe is necessarily privileged to the extent of being compatible with our existence as observers." For Carter, "location" refers to our location in time and space. Carter goes on to define the strong anthropic principle (SAP) as the idea that:

The universe (and hence the fundamental parameters on which it depends) must be such as to admit the creation of observers within it at some stage. To paraphrase Descartes, cogito ergo mundus talis est.

The Latin tag (which means, "I think, therefore the world is such [as it is]") makes it clear that "must" indicates a deduction from the fact of our existence; the statement is thus a truism.

Roger Penrose explained the weak form as follows:

The argument can be used to explain why the conditions happen to be just right for the existence of (intelligent) life on the Earth at the present time. For if they were not just right, then we should not have found ourselves to be here now, but somewhere else, at some other appropriate time. This principle was used very effectively by Brandon Carter and Robert Dicke to resolve an issue that had puzzled physicists for a good many years. The issue concerned various striking numerical relations that are observed to hold between the physical constants (the gravitational constant, the mass of the proton, the age of the universe, etc.). A puzzling aspect of this was that some of the relations hold only at the present epoch in the Earth's history, so we appear, coincidentally, to be living at a very special time (give or take a few million years!). This was later explained, by Carter and Dicke, by the fact that this epoch coincided with the lifetime of what are called main-sequence stars, such as the Sun. At any other epoch, the argument ran, there would be no intelligent life around to measure the physical constants in question—so the coincidence had to hold, simply because there would be intelligent life around only at the particular time that the coincidence did hold!

— The Emperor's New Mind, chapter 10

One reason this is plausible is that there are many other places and times in which humans could have evolved. But when applying the strong principle, there is only one universe, with one set of fundamental parameters. Thus, Carter offers two possibilities: First, humans can use their own existence to make "predictions" about the parameters. But second, "as a last resort", humans can convert these predictions into explanations by assuming that there is more than one universe, in fact a large and possibly infinite collection of universes, something that is now called the multiverse ("world ensemble" was Carter's term), in which the parameters (and perhaps the laws of physics) vary across universes. The strong principle then becomes an example of a selection effect, analogous to the weak principle. Postulating a multiverse is a radical step that could provide at least a partial insight, seemingly out of the reach of normal science, regarding why the fundamental laws of physics take the particular form we observe and not another.

In their 1986 book, The Anthropic Cosmological Principle, John Barrow and Frank Tipler depart from Carter and define the WAP and SAP differently. According to Barrow and Tipler, the WAP is the idea that:

The observed values of all physical and cosmological quantities are not equally probable but they take on values restricted by the requirement that there exist sites where carbon-based life can evolve and by the requirements that the universe be old enough for it to have already done so.

Unlike Carter, they restrict the principle to "carbon-based life" rather than just "observers". A more important difference is that they apply the WAP to the fundamental physical constants, such as the fine-structure constant, the number of spacetime dimensions, and the cosmological constant—topics that fall under Carter's SAP.

According to Barrow and Tipler, the SAP states that "the Universe must have those properties which allow life to develop within it at some stage in its history." While this looks very similar to Carter's SAP, the "must" is an imperative, as shown by the following three possible elaborations of the SAP, each proposed by Barrow and Tipler:

- "There exists one possible Universe 'designed' with the goal of generating and sustaining 'observers'."
  This can be seen as simply the classic design argument restated in the garb of contemporary cosmology. It implies that the purpose of the universe is to give rise to intelligent life, with the laws of nature and their fundamental physical constants set to ensure that life emerges and evolves.
- "Observers are necessary to bring the Universe into being."
  Barrow and Tipler believe that this is a valid conclusion from quantum mechanics, as John Archibald Wheeler has suggested, especially via his idea that information is the fundamental reality and his participatory anthropic principle (PAP), which is an interpretation of quantum mechanics associated with the ideas of Eugene Wigner.
- "An ensemble of other different universes is necessary for the existence of our Universe."
  By contrast, Carter merely says that an ensemble of universes is necessary for the SAP to count as an explanation.

Philosophers John Leslie and Nick Bostrom reject the Barrow and Tipler SAP as a fundamental misreading of Carter. For Bostrom, Carter's anthropic principle just warns us to make allowance for "anthropic bias"—that is, the bias created by anthropic selection effects (which Bostrom calls "observation" selection effects)—the necessity for observers to exist in order to get a result. He writes:

Many "anthropic principles" are simply confused. Some, especially those drawing inspiration from Brandon Carter's seminal papers, are sound, but... they are too weak to do any real scientific work. In particular, I argue that existing methodology does not permit any observational consequences to be derived from contemporary cosmological theories, though these theories quite plainly can be and are being tested empirically by astronomers. What is needed to bridge this methodological gap is a more adequate formulation of how observation selection effects are to be taken into account.

Bostrom defines a concept called the "strong self-sampling assumption" (SSSA), the idea that "each observer-moment should reason as if it were randomly selected from the class of all observer-moments in its reference class." Analyzing an observer's experience into a sequence of "observer-moments" like this helps avoid certain paradoxes, but the main ambiguity is the selection of the appropriate "reference class". For Carter's WAP, this might correspond to all real or potential observer-moments in our universe. As for his SAP, this might correspond to all in the multiverse. Bostrom's mathematical development shows that choosing too broad or too narrow a reference class leads to counter-intuitive results, but he is not able to prescribe an ideal choice.

According to Jürgen Schmidhuber, the anthropic principle essentially just says that the conditional probability of finding yourself in a universe compatible with your existence is always one. It does not allow for any additional nontrivial predictions such as "gravity won't change tomorrow". To gain more predictive power, additional assumptions on the prior distribution of alternative universes are necessary.

Playwright and novelist Michael Frayn describes a form of the strong anthropic principle in his 2006 book The Human Touch, which explores what he characterises as "the central oddity of the Universe":

It's this simple paradox. The Universe is very old and very large. Humankind, by comparison, is only a tiny disturbance in one small corner of it--and a very recent one. Yet the Universe is only very large and very old because we are here to say it is... And yet, of course, we all know perfectly well that it is what it is whether we are here or not.

== Character of anthropic reasoning ==
Carter chose to focus on a tautological aspect of his ideas, which has resulted in much confusion. In fact, anthropic reasoning interests scientists because of something that is only implicit in the above formal definitions, namely that humans should give serious consideration to there being other universes with different values of the "fundamental parameters"—that is, the dimensionless physical constants and initial conditions for the Big Bang. Carter and others have argued that life would not be possible in most such universes. In other words, the universe humans live in is fine tuned to permit life. Collins & Hawking (1973) characterized Carter's then-unpublished big idea as the postulate that "there is not one universe but a whole infinite ensemble of universes with all possible initial conditions". If this is granted, the anthropic principle provides a plausible explanation for the fine tuning of our universe: the "typical" universe is not fine-tuned, but given enough universes, a small fraction will be capable of supporting intelligent life. Ours must be one of these, and so the observed fine tuning should be no cause for wonder.

Although philosophers have discussed related concepts for centuries, in the early 1970s the only genuine physical theory yielding a multiverse of sorts was the many-worlds interpretation of quantum mechanics. This would allow variation in initial conditions, but not in the truly fundamental constants. Since that time a number of mechanisms for producing a multiverse have been suggested: see the review by Max Tegmark. An important development in the 1980s was the combination of inflation theory with the hypothesis that some parameters are determined by symmetry breaking in the early universe, which allows parameters previously thought of as "fundamental constants" to vary over very large distances, thus eroding the distinction between Carter's weak and strong principles. At the beginning of the 21st century, the string landscape emerged as a mechanism for varying essentially all the constants, including the number of spatial dimensions. (Note: Strictly speaking, the number of non-compact dimensions; see String theory.)

The anthropic idea that fundamental parameters are selected from a multitude of different possibilities (each actual in some universe or other) contrasts with the traditional hope of physicists for a theory of everything having no free parameters. As Albert Einstein said: "What really interests me is whether God had any choice in the creation of the world." In 2002, some proponents of the leading candidate for a "theory of everything", string theory, proclaimed "the end of the anthropic principle" since there would be no free parameters to select. In 2003, however, Leonard Susskind stated: "... it seems plausible that the landscape is unimaginably large and diverse. This is the behavior that gives credence to the anthropic principle."

The modern form of a design argument is put forth by intelligent design. Proponents of intelligent design often cite the fine-tuning observations that (in part) preceded the formulation of the anthropic principle by Carter as a proof of an intelligent designer. Opponents of intelligent design are not limited to those who hypothesize that other universes exist; they may also argue, anti-anthropically, that the universe is less fine-tuned than often claimed, or that accepting fine tuning as a brute fact is less astonishing than the idea of an intelligent creator. Furthermore, even accepting fine tuning, Sober (2005) and Ikeda and Jefferys, argue that the anthropic principle as conventionally stated actually undermines intelligent design.

Paul Davies's book The Goldilocks Enigma (2006) reviews the current state of the fine-tuning debate in detail, and concludes by enumerating the following responses to that debate:

1. The absurd universe: Our universe just happens to be the way it is.
2. The unique universe: There is a deep underlying unity in physics that necessitates the Universe being the way it is. A Theory of Everything will explain why the various features of the Universe must have exactly the values that have been recorded.
3. The multiverse: Multiple universes exist, having all possible combinations of characteristics, and humans inevitably find themselves within a universe that allows us to exist.
4. Intelligent design: A creator designed the Universe with the purpose of supporting complexity and the emergence of intelligence.
5. The life principle: There is an underlying principle that constrains the Universe to evolve towards life and mind.
6. The self-explaining universe: A closed explanatory or causal loop: "perhaps only universes with a capacity for consciousness can exist". This is Wheeler's participatory anthropic principle (PAP).
7. The fake universe: Humans live inside a virtual reality simulation.

Omitted here is Lee Smolin's model of cosmological natural selection, also known as fecund universes, which proposes that universes have "offspring" that are more plentiful if they resemble our universe. Also see Gardner (2005).

Clearly each of these hypotheses resolve some aspects of the puzzle, while leaving others unanswered. Followers of Carter would admit only option 3 as an anthropic explanation, whereas 3 through 6 are covered by different versions of Barrow and Tipler's SAP (which would also include 7 if it is considered a variant of 4, as in Tipler 1994).

The anthropic principle, at least as Carter conceived it, can be applied on scales much smaller than the whole universe. For example, Carter (1983) inverted the usual line of reasoning and pointed out that when interpreting the evolutionary record, one must take into account cosmological and astrophysical considerations. With this in mind, Carter concluded that given the best estimates of the age of the universe, the evolutionary chain culminating in Homo sapiens probably admits only one or two low probability links.

Some have argued that fine-tuning is not astonishing at all in itself, but only from our situated point of view, which must be factored out of the question. This argument was given in 2021 by David Chauvet in his writings on natural law, which is linked to the question of God and therefore to cosmology: the universe is only astonishing to those who value life, such as the humans who arose from it. In the same way, the number on a lottery ticket is nothing special, unless it is associated with a sum of money, which is itself valued. Without this valorization of life, fostered by the fact that observers spontaneously value it, the universe's parameters are no more astonishing than a winning lottery ticket would be to an observer for whom money holds no interest. As Chauvet argues:

It is arguably not surprising that those who have emerged from and are part of a life-supporting universe value a life-supporting universe over one that does not support life, just as someone who has emerged from and is part of a society where money is important values drawing a winning lottery number rather than drawing a losing number. If we consider this, there is no longer any real reason to be astonished by the fine-tuning of our universe, any more than there would be reason to be astonished by the fine-tuning of a universe that harbored nothing that seems interesting to us in one way or another.

== Observational evidence ==
No possible observational evidence bears on Carter's WAP, as it is merely advice to the scientist and asserts nothing debatable. The obvious test of Barrow's SAP, which says that the universe is "required" to support life, is to find evidence of life in universes other than ours. Any other universe is, by most definitions, unobservable (otherwise it would be included in our portion of this universe). Thus, in principle Barrow's SAP cannot be falsified by observing a universe in which an observer cannot exist.

Philosopher John Leslie states that the Carter SAP (with multiverse) predicts the following:

- Physical theory will evolve so as to strengthen the hypothesis that early phase transitions occur probabilistically rather than deterministically, in which case there will be no deep physical reason for the values of fundamental constants;
- Various theories for generating multiple universes will prove robust;
- Evidence that the universe is fine tuned will continue to accumulate;
- No life with a non-carbon chemistry will be discovered;
- Mathematical studies of galaxy formation will confirm that it is sensitive to the rate of expansion of the universe.

Hogan has emphasised that it would be very strange if all fundamental constants were strictly determined, since this would leave us with no ready explanation for apparent fine tuning. In fact, humans might have to resort to something akin to Barrow and Tipler's SAP: there would be no option for such a universe not to support life.

Probabilistic predictions of parameter values can be made given:

1. a particular multiverse with a "measure", i.e. a well defined "density of universes" (so, for parameter X, one can calculate the prior probability P(X_{0}) dX that X is in the range X_{0} < X < X_{0} + dX), and
2. an estimate of the number of observers in each universe, N(X) (e.g., this might be taken as proportional to the number of stars in the universe).

The probability of observing value X is then proportional to N(X) P(X). A generic feature of an analysis of this nature is that the expected values of the fundamental physical constants should not be "over-tuned", i.e. if there is some perfectly tuned predicted value (e.g. zero), the observed value need be no closer to that predicted value than what is required to make life possible. The small but finite value of the cosmological constant can be regarded as a successful prediction in this sense.

One thing that would not count as evidence for the anthropic principle is evidence that the Earth or the Solar System occupied a privileged position in the universe, in violation of the Copernican principle (for possible counterevidence to this principle, see Copernican principle), unless there was some reason to think that that position was a necessary condition for our existence as observers.

== Applications of the principle ==
=== The nucleosynthesis of carbon-12 ===
Fred Hoyle may have invoked anthropic reasoning to predict an astrophysical phenomenon. He is said to have reasoned, from the prevalence on Earth of life forms whose chemistry was based on carbon-12 nuclei, that there must be an undiscovered resonance in the carbon-12 nucleus facilitating its synthesis in stellar interiors via the triple-alpha process. He then calculated the energy of this undiscovered resonance to be 7.6 million electronvolts. Willie Fowler's research group soon found this resonance, and its measured energy was close to Hoyle's prediction.

However, in 2010 Helge Kragh argued that Hoyle did not use anthropic reasoning in making his prediction, since he made his prediction in 1953 and anthropic reasoning did not come into prominence until 1980. He called this an "anthropic myth", saying that Hoyle and others made an after-the-fact connection between carbon and life decades after the discovery of the resonance.

An investigation of the historical circumstances of the prediction and its subsequent experimental confirmation shows that Hoyle and his contemporaries did not associate the level in the carbon nucleus with life at all.

=== Cosmic inflation ===
Don Page criticized the entire theory of cosmic inflation as follows. He emphasized that initial conditions that made possible a thermodynamic arrow of time in a universe with a Big Bang origin, must include the assumption that at the initial singularity, the entropy of the universe was low and therefore extremely improbable. Paul Davies rebutted this criticism by invoking an inflationary version of the anthropic principle. While Davies accepted the premise that the initial state of the visible universe (which filled a microscopic amount of space before inflating) had to possess a very low entropy value—due to random quantum fluctuations—to account for the observed thermodynamic arrow of time, he deemed this fact an advantage for the theory. That the tiny patch of space from which our observable universe grew had to be extremely orderly, to allow the post-inflation universe to have an arrow of time, makes it unnecessary to adopt any "ad hoc" hypotheses about the initial entropy state, hypotheses other Big Bang theories require.

=== String theory ===
String theory predicts a large number of possible universes, called the "backgrounds" or "vacua". The set of these vacua is often called the "multiverse" or "anthropic landscape" or "string landscape". Leonard Susskind has argued that the existence of a large number of vacua puts anthropic reasoning on firm ground: only universes whose properties are such as to allow observers to exist are observed, while a possibly much larger set of universes lacking such properties go unnoticed.

Steven Weinberg believes the anthropic principle may be appropriated by cosmologists committed to nontheism, and refers to that principle as a "turning point" in modern science because applying it to the string landscape "may explain how the constants of nature that we observe can take values suitable for life without being fine-tuned by a benevolent creator". Others—most notably David Gross but also Luboš Motl, Peter Woit, and Lee Smolin—argue that this is not predictive. Max Tegmark, Mario Livio, and Martin Rees argue that only some aspects of a physical theory need be observable and/or testable for the theory to be accepted, and that many well-accepted theories are far from completely testable at present.

Jürgen Schmidhuber (2000–2002) points out that Ray Solomonoff's theory of universal inductive inference and its extensions already provide a framework for maximizing our confidence in any theory, given a limited sequence of physical observations, and some prior distribution on the set of possible explanations of the universe.

Zhi-Wei Wang and Samuel L. Braunstein proved that life's existence in the universe depends on various fundamental constants. It suggests that without a complete understanding of these constants, one might incorrectly perceive the universe as being intelligently designed for life. This perspective challenges the view that our universe is unique in its ability to support life.

=== Dimensions of spacetime ===
Properties of (n + m)-dimensional spacetimes

There are two kinds of dimensions: spatial (bidirectional) and temporal (unidirectional). Let the number of spatial dimensions be N and the number of temporal dimensions be T. That N = 3 and T = 1—setting aside the compactified dimensions invoked by string theory which have been, to date, undetected—can be explained by appealing to the physical consequences of letting N differ from 3 and T differ from 1. The argument is often of an anthropic character and possibly the first of its kind, albeit before the complete concept came into vogue.

The implicit notion that the dimensionality of the universe is special is first attributed to Gottfried Wilhelm Leibniz, who in the Discourse on Metaphysics suggested that the world is "the one which is at the same time the simplest in hypothesis and the richest in phenomena". Immanuel Kant argued that 3-dimensional space was a consequence of the inverse square law of universal gravitation. While Kant's argument is historically important, John D. Barrow said that it "gets the punch-line back to front: it is the three-dimensionality of space that explains why we see inverse-square force laws in Nature, not vice-versa" (Barrow 2002:204). (Note: This is because the law of gravitation (or any other inverse-square law) follows from the concept of flux and the proportional relationship of flux density and field strength. If N = 3, then 3-dimensional solid objects have surface areas proportional to the square of their size in any selected spatial dimension. In particular, a sphere of radius r has a surface area of 4πr^{2}. More generally, in a space of N dimensions, the strength of the gravitational attraction between two bodies separated by a distance of r would be inversely proportional to r^{N−1}.)

In 1920, Paul Ehrenfest showed that if there is only a single time dimension and more than three spatial dimensions, the orbit of a planet about its Sun cannot remain stable. The same is true of a star's orbit around the center of its galaxy. Ehrenfest also showed that if there are an even number of spatial dimensions and at least four, then the different parts of a wave impulse will travel at different speeds. If there are an odd number of spatial dimensions and at least five, then wave impulses become distorted. In 1922, Hermann Weyl claimed that Maxwell's theory of electromagnetism can be expressed in terms of an action only for a four-dimensional manifold. Finally, Tangherlini showed in 1963 that when there are more than three spatial dimensions, electron orbitals around nuclei cannot be stable; electrons would either fall into the nucleus or disperse.

Max Tegmark expands on the preceding argument in the following anthropic manner. If T differs from 1, the behavior of physical systems could not be predicted reliably from knowledge of the relevant partial differential equations. In such a universe, intelligent life capable of manipulating technology could not emerge. Moreover, if T > 1, Tegmark maintains that protons and electrons would be unstable and could decay into particles having greater mass than themselves. (This does not occur if the particles have a sufficiently low temperature.)

Lastly, if N < 3, gravitation of any kind becomes problematic, and the universe would probably be too simple to contain observers. For example, when N < 3, nerves cannot cross without intersecting. Hence anthropic and other arguments rule out all cases except N = 3 and T = 1, which describes the world around us. However, in 2019, James Scargill argued that complex life may be possible with two spatial dimensions. According to Scargill, a purely scalar theory of gravity may enable a local gravitational force, and 2D networks may be sufficient for complex neural networks.

On the other hand, in view of creating black holes from an ideal monatomic gas under its self-gravity, Wei-Xiang Feng showed that (3 + 1)-dimensional spacetime is the marginal dimensionality. Moreover, it is the unique dimensionality that can afford a "stable" gas sphere with a "positive" cosmological constant. However, a self-gravitating gas cannot be stably bound if the mass sphere is larger than ~10^{21} solar masses, due to the small positivity of the cosmological constant observed.

== Metaphysical interpretations ==
Some of the metaphysical disputes and speculations include, for example, attempts to back Pierre Teilhard de Chardin's earlier interpretation of the universe as being Christ centered (compare Omega Point), expressing a creatio evolutiva instead the elder notion of creatio continua. From a strictly secular, humanist perspective, it allows as well to put human beings back in the center, an anthropogenic shift in cosmology. Karl W. Giberson has laconically stated that

What emerges is the suggestion that cosmology may at last be in possession of some raw material for a postmodern creation myth.

— Karl W. Giberson

William Sims Bainbridge disagreed with de Chardin's optimism about a future Omega point at the end of history, arguing that logically, humans are trapped at the Omicron point, in the middle of the Greek alphabet rather than advancing to the end, because the universe does not need to have any characteristics that would support our further technical progress, if the anthropic principle merely requires it to be suitable for our evolution to this point.

=== The Anthropic Cosmological Principle ===
A thorough extant study of the anthropic principle is the book The Anthropic Cosmological Principle by John D. Barrow, a cosmologist, and Frank J. Tipler, a cosmologist and mathematical physicist. This book sets out in detail the many known anthropic coincidences and constraints, including many found by its authors. While the book is primarily a work of theoretical astrophysics, it also touches on quantum physics, chemistry, and earth science. An entire chapter argues that Homo sapiens is, with high probability, the only intelligent species in the Milky Way.

The book begins with an extensive review of many topics in the history of ideas the authors deem relevant to the anthropic principle, because the authors believe that principle has important antecedents in the notions of teleology and intelligent design. They discuss the writings of Fichte, Hegel, Bergson, and Alfred North Whitehead, and the Omega Point cosmology of Teilhard de Chardin. Barrow and Tipler carefully distinguish teleological reasoning from eutaxiological reasoning; the former asserts that order must have a consequent purpose; the latter asserts more modestly that order must have a planned cause. They attribute this important but nearly always overlooked distinction to an obscure 1883 book by L. E. Hicks.

Seeing little sense in a principle requiring intelligent life to emerge while remaining indifferent to the possibility of its eventual extinction, Barrow and Tipler propose the final anthropic principle (FAP): Intelligent information-processing must come into existence in the universe, and, once it comes into existence, it will never die out.

Barrow and Tipler submit that the FAP is both a valid physical statement and "closely connected with moral values". FAP places strong constraints on the structure of the universe, constraints developed further in Tipler's The Physics of Immortality. One such constraint is that the universe must end in a Big Crunch, which seems unlikely in view of the tentative conclusions drawn since 1998 about dark energy, based on observations of very distant supernovas.

In his review of Barrow and Tipler, Martin Gardner ridiculed the FAP by quoting the last two sentences of their book as defining a completely ridiculous anthropic principle (CRAP):

At the instant the Omega Point is reached, life will have gained control of all matter and forces not only in a single universe, but in all universes whose existence is logically possible; life will have spread into all spatial regions in all universes which could logically exist, and will have stored an infinite amount of information, including all bits of knowledge that it is logically possible to know. And this is the end.

== Reception and controversies ==
Carter has frequently expressed regret for his own choice of the word "anthropic", because it conveys the misleading impression that the principle involves humans in particular, to the exclusion of non-human intelligence more broadly. Others have criticised the word "principle" as being too grandiose to describe straightforward applications of selection effects.

A common criticism of Carter's SAP is that it is an easy deus ex machina that discourages searches for physical explanations. To quote Penrose again: "It tends to be invoked by theorists whenever they do not have a good enough theory to explain the observed facts."

Carter's SAP and Barrow and Tipler's WAP have been dismissed as truisms or trivial tautologies, i.e. that statements true solely by virtue of their logical form and not because a substantive claim is made and supported by observation of reality. As such, they are criticized as an elaborate way of saying, "If things were different, they would be different", which is a valid statement, but does not make a claim of some factual alternative over another.

Critics of the Barrow and Tipler SAP claim that it is neither testable nor falsifiable, and thus is not a scientific statement but rather a philosophical one. The same criticism has been leveled against the hypothesis of a multiverse, although some argue that it does make falsifiable predictions. A modified version of this criticism is that humanity understands so little about the emergence of life, especially intelligent life, that it is effectively impossible to calculate the number of observers in each universe. Also, the prior distribution of universes as a function of the fundamental constants is easily modified to get any desired result.

Many criticisms focus on versions of the strong anthropic principle, such as Barrow and Tipler's anthropic cosmological principle, which are teleological notions that tend to describe the existence of life as a necessary prerequisite for the observable constants of physics. Similarly, Stephen Jay Gould, Michael Shermer, and others claim that the stronger versions of the anthropic principle seem to reverse known causes and effects. Gould compared the claim that the universe is fine-tuned for the benefit of our kind of life to saying that sausages were made long and narrow so that they could fit into modern hotdog buns, or saying that ships had been invented to house barnacles. These critics cite the vast physical, fossil, genetic, and other biological evidence consistent with life having been fine-tuned through natural selection to adapt to the physical and geophysical environment in which life exists. Life appears to have adapted to the universe, and not vice versa.

Some applications of the anthropic principle have been criticized as an argument by lack of imagination, for tacitly assuming that carbon compounds and water are the only possible chemistry of life (sometimes called "carbon chauvinism"; see also alternative biochemistry). The range of fundamental physical constants consistent with the evolution of carbon-based life may also be wider than those who advocate a fine-tuned universe have argued. For instance, Harnik et al. propose a Weakless Universe in which the weak nuclear force is eliminated. They show that this has no significant effect on the other fundamental interactions, provided some adjustments are made in how those interactions work. However, if some of the fine-tuned details of our universe were violated, that would rule out complex structures of any kind –stars, planets, galaxies, etc.

Lee Smolin has offered a theory designed to improve on the lack of imagination that has been ascribed to anthropic principles. He puts forth his fecund universes theory, which assumes universes have "offspring" through the creation of black holes whose offspring universes have values of physical constants that depend on those of the mother universe.

The philosophers of cosmology John Earman, Ernan McMullin, and Jesús Mosterín contend that "in its weak version, the anthropic principle is a mere tautology, which does not allow us to explain anything or to predict anything that we did not already know. In its strong version, it is a gratuitous speculation". A further criticism by Mosterín concerns the flawed "anthropic" inference from the assumption of an infinity of worlds to the existence of one like ours:

The suggestion that an infinity of objects characterized by certain numbers or properties implies the existence among them of objects with any combination of those numbers or characteristics [...] is mistaken. An infinity does not imply at all that any arrangement is present or repeated. [...] The assumption that all possible worlds are realized in an infinite universe is equivalent to the assertion that any infinite set of numbers contains all numbers (or at least all Gödel numbers of the [defining] sequences), which is obviously false.

== See also ==
- Anthropocentrism – Worldview that humans are the most important beings
- Arthur Schopenhauer – German philosopher (1788–1860) (an immediate precursor of the idea)
- Big Bounce – Model for the origin of the universe
- Copernican principle – Principle that humans are not privileged observers of the universe
- Doomsday argument – Doomsday scenario on human births
- Fermi paradox – Discrepancy of the lack of evidence for alien life despite its apparent likelihood
- Fine-tuned universe – Hypothesis about life in the universe
- Goldilocks principle – Analogy for optimal conditions
- Great Filter – Hypothesis of barriers to forming interstellar civilizations
- Infinite monkey theorem – Counterintuitive result in probability
- Inverse gambler's fallacy – Formal fallacy of Bayesian inference
- Mathematical universe hypothesis – Cosmological theory
- Measure problem (cosmology) – Concept in cosmology
- Mediocrity principle – Philosophical concept
- Metaphysical naturalism – Philosophical worldview rejecting anything supernatural
- Neocatastrophism – Hypothesis for lack of detected aliens
- Quark mass and congeniality to life – Costa Rican physicist (work of Alejandro Jenkins)
- Rare Earth hypothesis – Hypothesis that planets with complex life are extremely rare
- Sleeping Beauty problem – Mathematical problem
- Triple-alpha process – Nuclear fusion reaction
- Why is there anything at all? – Metaphysical question
- Vertiginous question – Philosophical question about personal identity
