= Fine-tuned universe =

Hypothesis about life in the universe

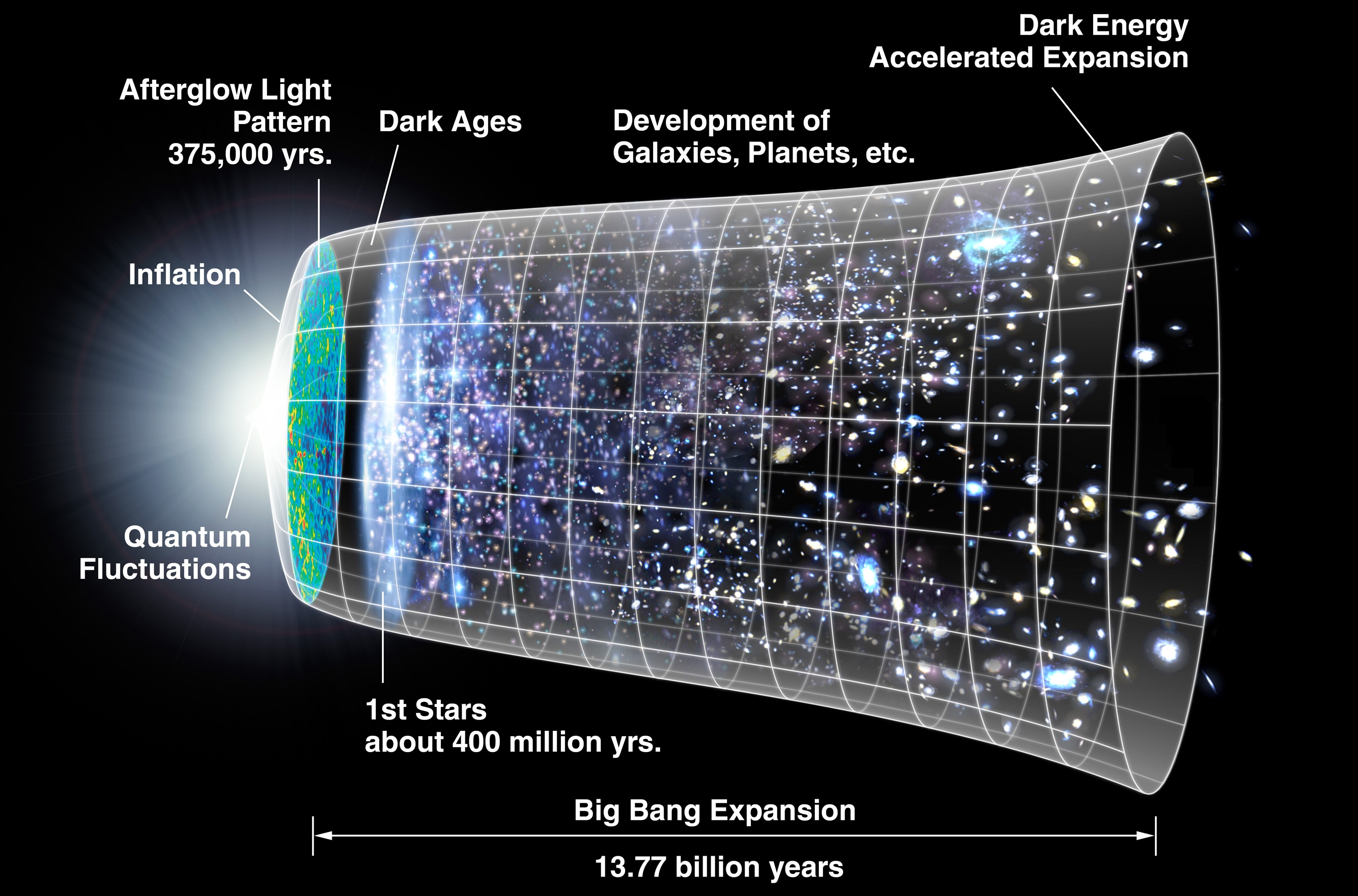
Timeline of the expansion of the universe, where space is represented schematically at each time by circular sections. On the left, the dramatic expansion of inflation; at the center, the expansion accelerates (artist's concept; neither time nor size are to scale).

The fine-tuned universe is the hypothesis that, because "life as we know it" could not exist if the constants of nature—such as the electron charge or the gravitational constant—had been even slightly different, the universe must be tuned specifically for life. In practice, this hypothesis is formulated in relation to dimensionless physical constants. These physical constants, parameters, and initial conditions of the universe at or around the Big Bang played a key role in allowing life to emerge and evolve. There are about 31 physical constants in the Standard Model of particle physics and the standard model of cosmology combined, and they seem to have unusual precision.

== History ==
In 1913, chemist Lawrence Joseph Henderson wrote The Fitness of the Environment, one of the first books to explore fine tuning in the universe. Henderson discusses the importance of water and the environment to living things, pointing out that life as it exists on Earth depends entirely on Earth's very specific environmental conditions, especially the prevalence and properties of water.

In 1961, physicist Robert H. Dicke argued that certain forces in physics, such as gravity and electromagnetism, must be perfectly fine-tuned for life to exist in the universe.

Astronomer Fred Hoyle argued for a fine-tuned universe: "From 1953 onward, Willy Fowler and I have always been intrigued by the remarkable relation of [...] and your fixing would have to be just where these levels are actually found to be. [...] A common sense interpretation of the facts suggests that a superintellect has monkeyed with physics, as well as with chemistry and biology, and that there are no blind forces worth speaking about in nature." In his 1983 book The Intelligent Universe, Hoyle wrote, "The list of anthropic properties, apparent accidents of a non-biological nature without which carbon-based and hence human life could not exist, is large and impressive."

The desire to resolve the fine-tuning problem led to the expectation that the Large Hadron Collider would produce evidence of physics beyond the Standard Model, such as supersymmetry, but by 2012 it had not produced evidence for supersymmetry at the energy scales it was able to probe. This absence leaves the fine-tuning problem unresolved, leading some physicists to suggest that the Standard Model may fundamentally require fine-tuning rather than a natural explanation.

== Background and arguments ==
Physicist Paul Davies said: "There is now broad agreement among physicists and cosmologists that the Universe is in several respects 'fine-tuned' for life. But the conclusion is not so much that the Universe is fine-tuned for life; rather it is fine-tuned for the building blocks and environments that life requires". Astrophysicist Luke Barnes performed a literature review of scientific research on fine tuning and found that fine tuning is generally acknowledged by physicists of secular and non-secular worldviews. Davies also said that "'anthropic' reasoning fails to distinguish between minimally biophilic universes, in which life is permitted, but only marginally possible, and optimally biophilic universes, in which life flourishes because biogenesis occurs frequently". Among scientists who find the evidence persuasive, a variety of natural explanations have been proposed, such as the existence of multiple universes introducing a survivorship bias under the anthropic principle.

The premise of the fine-tuned universe assertion is that physical constants are so highly ordered and exact (by orders of magnitude with many zeroes—indicating non-random or finely adjusted values) that a small change in several of the constants would make the universe radically different. Stephen Hawking observed: "The laws of science, as we know them at present, contain many fundamental numbers, like the size of the electric charge of the electron and the ratio of the masses of the proton and the electron. ... The remarkable fact is that the values of these numbers seem to have been very finely adjusted to make possible the development of life". Physicists have tried to find underlying theories or calculations that would give rise or explain the values of these physical constants.

For example, if the strong nuclear force were 2% stronger than it is (i.e. if the coupling constant representing its strength were 2% larger) while the other constants were left unchanged, diprotons would be stable; according to Davies, hydrogen would fuse into them instead of deuterium and helium. This would drastically alter the physics of stars, and presumably preclude the existence of life similar to what we observe on Earth. The diproton's existence would short-circuit the slow fusion of hydrogen into deuterium. Hydrogen would fuse so easily that it is likely that all the universe's hydrogen would be consumed in the first few minutes after the Big Bang. This "diproton argument" is disputed by other physicists, who calculate that as long as the increase in strength is less than 50%, stellar fusion could occur despite the existence of stable diprotons.

The precise formulation of the idea is made difficult by the fact that it is not yet known how many independent physical constants there are. The Standard Model of particle physics has 25 freely adjustable parameters and general relativity has one more, the cosmological constant, which is known to be nonzero but profoundly small in value. Because physicists have not developed an empirically successful theory of quantum gravity, there is no known way to combine quantum mechanics, on which the standard model depends, and general relativity.

Without knowledge of this more complete theory suspected to underlie the standard model, it is impossible to definitively count the number of truly independent physical constants. In some candidate theories, the number of independent physical constants may be as small as one. For example, the cosmological constant may be a fundamental constant but attempts have also been made to calculate it from other constants, and according to the author of one such calculation, "the small value of the cosmological constant is telling us that a remarkably precise and totally unexpected relation exists among all the parameters of the Standard Model of particle physics, the bare cosmological constant and unknown physics".

== Examples ==
=== Physical constants ===
There are about 31 constants in the standard model of particle physics and the standard model of cosmology combined. Some widely acknowledged constants by physicists of diverse backgrounds, that were fixed (many zeroes and orders of magnitude—indicating non-random or finely adjusted values) at or around the time of Big Bang include:

- The force of gravity - G = 6.67418 × 10^{−11} m^{3}kg^{−1}s^{−2} with a coupling constant α_{g} = 10^{−39}
- The electromagnetic force (fine structure constant) - α = 0.007297
- The strong force (cohesion of atomic nuclei and nucleons) - α_{s} = 1
- The weak force (within atomic nucleus) - α_{w} = 10^{−6}
- Speed of light - c = 299,792,458 m/s
- Planck constant - h = 6.62607015×10^{−34} J⋅Hz^{−1}
- Boltzmann constant - k = 1.380649×10^{−23} J⋅K^{−1}
- Charge of a proton and electron - e = 1.602176634×10^{−19} C
- Mass of proton - 1.6726219 × 10^{−27} kg
- Mass of neutron - 1.6749274 × 10^{−27} kg (.14% greater than mass of proton)
- Mass of electron - 9.109383 × 10^{−31} kg
- Mass energy density of the universe at the origin
- Velocity of expansion of the universe
- Cosmological constant - 1.289 × 10^{−52} m^{−2}
- Density and mass of the universe after the Big Bang
- Speed of expansion of the universe after the Big Bang

Martin Rees formulates the fine-tuning of the universe in terms of the following six dimensionless physical constants.

- N, the ratio of the electromagnetic force to the gravitational force between a pair of protons, is approximately 10^{36}. According to Rees, if it were significantly smaller, only a small and short-lived universe could exist. If it were large enough, they would repel them so violently that larger atoms would never be generated.
- Epsilon (ε), a measure of the nuclear efficiency of fusion from hydrogen to helium, is 0.007: when four nucleons fuse into helium, 0.007 (0.7%) of their mass is converted to energy. The value of ε is in part determined by the strength of the strong nuclear force. If ε were 0.006, a proton could not bond to a neutron, and only hydrogen could exist, and complex chemistry would be impossible. According to Rees, if it were above 0.008, no hydrogen would exist, as all the hydrogen would have been fused shortly after the Big Bang. Other physicists disagree, calculating that substantial hydrogen remains as long as the strong force coupling constant increases by less than about 50%.
- Omega (Ω), commonly known as the density parameter, is the relative importance of gravity and expansion energy in the universe. It is the ratio of the mass density of the universe to the "critical density" and is approximately 1. If gravity were too strong compared with dark energy and the initial cosmic expansion rate, the universe would have collapsed before life could have evolved. If gravity were too weak, no stars would have formed.
- Lambda (Λ), commonly known as the cosmological constant, describes the ratio of the density of dark energy to the critical energy density of the universe, given certain reasonable assumptions such as that dark energy density is a constant. In terms of Planck units, and as a natural dimensionless value, Λ is on the order of 10^{−122}. This is so small that it has no significant effect on cosmic structures that are smaller than a billion light-years across. A slightly larger value of the cosmological constant would have caused space to expand rapidly enough that stars and other astronomical structures would not be able to form.
- Q, the ratio of the gravitational energy required to pull a large galaxy apart to the energy equivalent of its mass, is around 10^{−5}. If it is too small, no stars can form. If it is too large, no stars can survive because the universe is too violent, according to Rees.
- D, the number of spatial dimensions in spacetime, is 3. Rees claims that life could not exist if there were 2 or 4 spatial dimensions. Rees argues this does not preclude the existence of ten-dimensional strings.

Max Tegmark argued that if there is more than one time dimension, then physical systems' behavior could not be predicted reliably from knowledge of the relevant partial differential equations. In such a universe, intelligent life capable of manipulating technology could not emerge. Moreover, protons and electrons would be unstable and could decay into particles having greater mass than themselves. This is not a problem if the particles have a sufficiently low temperature.

=== Carbon and oxygen ===
An older example is the Hoyle state, the third-lowest energy state of the carbon-12 nucleus, with an energy of 7.656 MeV above the ground level. According to one calculation, if the state's energy level were lower than 7.3 or greater than 7.9 MeV, insufficient carbon would exist to support life. To explain the universe's abundance of carbon, the Hoyle state must be further tuned to a value between 7.596 and 7.716 MeV. A similar calculation, focusing on the underlying fundamental constants that give rise to various energy levels, concludes that the strong force must be tuned to a precision of at least 0.5%, and the electromagnetic force to a precision of at least 4%, to prevent either carbon production or oxygen production from dropping significantly.

== Explanations ==
Explanations for the observed fine tuning have been proposed including naturalistic and non-naturalistic arguments.

=== Multiverse ===
If the universe is just one of many (possibly infinitely many) universes, each with different physical phenomena and constants, it is unsurprising that there is a universe hospitable to intelligent life. Some versions of the multiverse hypothesis therefore provide a simple explanation for any fine-tuning, while the analysis of Wang and Braunstein challenges the view that this universe is unique in its ability to support life.

Although there is no evidence for the existence of a multiverse, some versions of the theory make predictions of which some researchers studying M-theory and gravity leaks, though there is no evidence for these either. The multiverse idea has led to considerable research into the anthropic principle and has been of particular interest to particle physicists because theories of everything do apparently generate large numbers of universes in which the physical constants vary widely. According to Laura Mersini-Houghton, the WMAP cold spot could provide a testable case of a parallel universe. Variants of this approach include Lee Smolin's notion of cosmological natural selection, the ekpyrotic universe, and the bubble universe theory.

Some have argued that more fundamental physics may explain the apparent fine-tuning in physical parameters in the current understanding by constraining the values those parameters are likely to take. As Lawrence Krauss put it, "certain quantities have seemed inexplicable and fine-tuned, and once we understand them, they don't seem to be so fine-tuned. We have to have some historical perspective". Victor J. Stenger has hypothesized that random selection of physical parameters can still produce universes capable of harboring life. Some argue it is possible that a final, fundamental theory of everything will explain the underlying causes of apparent fine-tuning. Some hypothesize that parameters can have different values outside the known universe. On this hypothesis, separate parts of reality would have wildly different characteristics. In such scenarios, the appearance of fine-tuning is a consequence of the weak anthropic principle and selection bias, specifically survivorship bias. Only those universes with fundamental constants hospitable to life, such as on Earth, could contain life forms capable of observing the universe who can contemplate the question of fine-tuning. Zhi-Wei Wang and Samuel L. Braunstein argue that the apparent fine-tuning of fundamental constants could be due to lack of understanding of these constants.

There is no empirical evidence of a multiverse and it is not considered a falsifiable hypothesis. Astrophysicists have pointed out numerous scientific problems with the multiverse hypothesis, including what it would really take to define, observe, and differentiate any alternate universe. It has been suggested that invoking the multiverse to explain fine-tuning is a form of the inverse gambler's fallacy.

=== Top-down cosmology ===
Stephen Hawking and Thomas Hertog proposed that the universe's initial conditions consisted of a superposition of many possible initial conditions, only a small fraction of which contributed to the conditions seen today. According to the top-down cosmology theory, the universe's "fine-tuned" physical constants are inevitable, because the universe "selects" only those histories that led to the present conditions. In this way, top-down cosmology provides an anthropic explanation for why this universe allows matter and life without invoking the multiverse.

=== Carbon chauvinism ===
Some forms of fine-tuning arguments about the formation of life assume that only carbon-based life forms are possible, an assumption sometimes called carbon chauvinism. Conceptually, alternative biochemistry or other forms of life are possible.

=== Simulation hypothesis ===
The simulation hypothesis holds that the universe is fine-tuned simply because the more technologically advanced simulation operator(s) programmed it that way.

=== No improbability ===
Graham Priest, Mark Colyvan, Jay L. Garfield, and others have argued against the presupposition that "the laws of physics or the boundary conditions of the universe could have been other than they are".

=== Theistic ===
Some scientists, theologians, and philosophers, as well as certain religious groups, argue that providence or creation are responsible for fine-tuning. Astrophysicist Luke Barnes varied the 31 fundamental constants of the standard model of particle physics and cosmology and concluded that variants do not yield multiple universes with life. Christian philosopher Alvin Plantinga argues that random chance, applied to a single and sole universe, only raises the question as to why this universe could be so "lucky" as to have precise conditions that support life at least at some place (the Earth) and time (within millions of years of the present).

One reaction to these apparent enormous coincidences is to see them as substantiating the theistic claim that the universe has been created by a personal God and as offering the material for a properly restrained theistic argument – hence the fine-tuning argument. It's as if there are a large number of dials that have to be tuned to within extremely narrow limits for life to be possible in our universe. It is extremely unlikely that this should happen by chance, but much more likely that this should happen if there is such a person as God.

— Alvin Plantinga, "The Dawkins Confusion: Naturalism ad absurdum"

William Lane Craig, a philosopher and Christian apologist, cites this fine-tuning of the universe as evidence for the existence of God or some form of intelligence capable of manipulating (or designing) the basic physics that governs the universe. Philosopher and theologian Richard Swinburne reaches the design conclusion using Bayesian probability. Scientist and theologian Alister McGrath observed that the fine-tuning of carbon is even responsible for nature's ability to tune itself to any degree.

The entire biological evolutionary process depends upon the unusual chemistry of carbon, which allows it to bond to itself, as well as other elements, creating highly complex molecules that are stable over prevailing terrestrial temperatures, and are capable of conveying genetic information (especially DNA). [...] Whereas it might be argued that nature creates its own fine-tuning, this can only be done if the primordial constituents of the universe are such that an evolutionary process can be initiated. The unique chemistry of carbon is the ultimate foundation of the capacity of nature to tune itself.

Theoretical physicist and Anglican priest John Polkinghorne stated: "Anthropic fine tuning is too remarkable to be dismissed as just a happy accident".

Theologian and philosopher Andrew Loke argues that there are only five possible categories of hypotheses concerning fine-tuning and order: (i) chance, (ii) regularity, (iii) combinations of regularity and chance, (iv) uncaused, and (v) design, and that only design gives an exclusively logical explanation of order in the universe. He argues that the Kalam Cosmological Argument strengthens the teleological argument by answering the question "Who designed the Designer?".

Creationist Hugh Ross advances a number of fine-tuning hypotheses. One is the existence of what Ross calls "vital poisons", which are elemental nutrients that are harmful in large quantities but essential for animal life in smaller quantities.

Philosopher and theologian Robin Collins argues that theism entails the expectation that God would create a reality structured to allow for scientific discovery to easily happen. According to Collins, various physical constants such as the fine-structure constant allowing for efficient energy usage, the baryon-to-photon ratio allowing for the cosmic microwave background to be discovered, and the mass of the Higgs boson allowing it to be detected are examples of the laws of physics being fine-tuned for scientific discovery.

Evolutionary biologist Richard Dawkins dismisses the theistic argument as "deeply unsatisfying" since it leaves the existence of God unexplained, with a God capable of calculating the fine-tuning at least as improbable as the fine-tuning itself. Against this claim, it has been argued that theism is a simple hypothesis, allowing theists to deny that God is at least as improbable as the fine-tuning.

== See also ==
- Abiogenesis – Life arising from non-living matter
- Anthropic principle – Hypothesis about sapient life and the universe
- Biochemistry – Study of chemical processes of living organisms
- Clockwork universe – Deterministic model of the universe
- CP violation – Violation of charge-parity symmetry in particle physics and cosmology
- Fine-tuning (disambiguation)
- God of the gaps
- Lottery paradox
- Possible world
- Rare Earth hypothesis – Hypothesis that planets with complex life are extremely rare
- Teleology – Thinking in terms of destiny or purpose
- Ultimate fate of the universe – Theories about the end of the universe
- Why is there anything at all? – Metaphysical question
