= J. Richard Gott =

American astrophysicist (born 1947)

John Richard Gott III
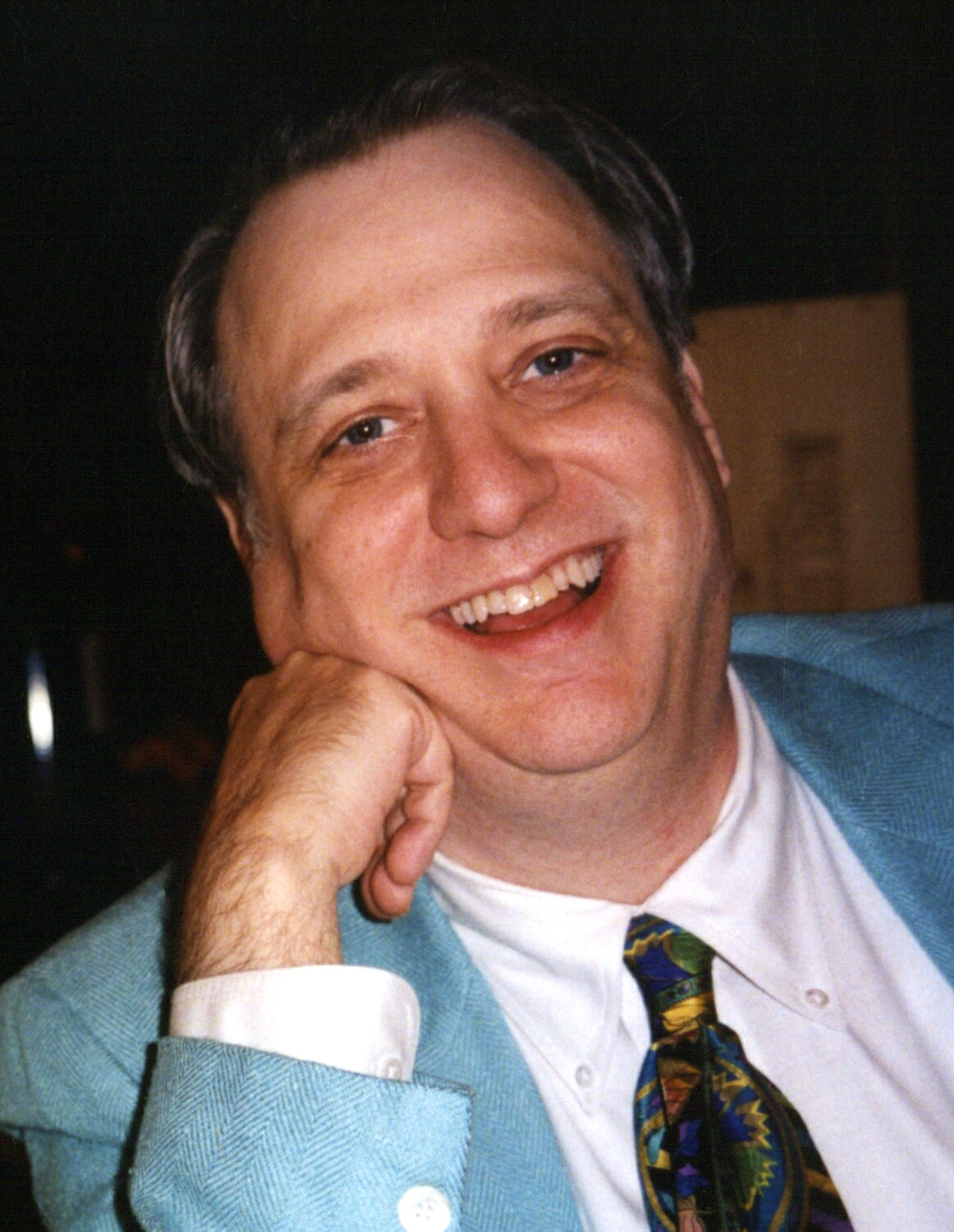
- J. Richard Gott (1989)
- Born: February 8, 1947 (age 79); Louisville, Kentucky, United States
- Scientific career
- Fields: Astrophysics, gravitational physics
- Workplaces: Princeton University
- Notable students: Matthew Headrick

John Richard Gott III (born February 8, 1947) is an American astrophysicist. He is professor of astrophysical sciences at Princeton University. He is known for his work on time travel and the Doomsday argument.

== Exotic matter time travel theories ==
Paul Davies's bestseller How to Build a Time Machine credits Gott with the proposal of using cosmic strings to create a time machine. Gott's machine depends upon the antigravitational tension of the (hypothetical) strings to deform space without attracting nearby objects. The traveler would follow a precise path around rapidly separating strings, and find that he or she had moved backwards in time. Gott's solution does require that the strings are infinitely long, though; a theorem by Stephen Hawking proves that according to general relativity, closed timelike curves cannot be created in a finite region of space unless there is exotic matter present which violates certain energy conditions, while cosmic strings would not be expected to violate these conditions, so strings of finite length would not work.

Gott also proposed a "time mirror": a time travel device based on the principle of time delays. The device would be situated near a black hole some hundred or more light years from Earth. The device would act as a light collector and would power the light rays deformed and curved by the gravitational depression of the black hole. The collector would then reveal the past as detailed by the photons that had originated from Earth.

Since Gott believes that time travel is not cosmologically excluded, he has presented the possibility that the universe was created out of itself (at a later time). This controversial suggestion was published with Li-Xin Lin, and it was described by Gott as "it would be like having one branch of a tree circle around and grow up to be the trunk. In that way, the universe could be its own mother."

In his own book, Time Travel in Einstein's Universe: The Physical Possibilities of Travel Through Time, Gott argues that travel to the past is quite possible, although probably only after the construction of a working device (during its existence), and certainly not onto the time traveler's own past timeline (he argues that either the many worlds interpretation of quantum mechanics must be invoked to overcome the Grandfather paradox, or that all time travel remain self-consistent, i.e., one can visit the past but not change it, as in the Novikov self-consistency principle). Although he is keen to emphasize that time travel itself is a commonplace physical phenomenon, by this he means time travel into the future at varying rates through special relativity, he is not completely committed on the subject of time travel to the past. The book does say that nothing known excludes such travel, but he does not completely rule out the possibility that future research may prove it impossible.

== Copernicus method and Doomsday theory ==
Gott first thought of his "Copernicus method" of lifetime estimation in 1969 when stopping at the Berlin Wall and wondering how long it would stand. Gott postulated that the Copernican principle is applicable in cases where nothing is known; unless there was something special about his visit (which he did not think there was) this gave a 75% chance that he was seeing the wall after the first quarter of its life. Based on its age in 1969 (8 years), Gott left the wall with 50% confidence that it would not be there in 1993 (1969 + 8·(1.5/0.5)).

In fact, the wall was brought down in 1989, and 1993 was the year in which Gott applied his "Copernicus method" to the lifetime of the human race. His paper in Nature was the first to apply the Copernican principle to the survival of humanity; his original prediction gave 95% confidence that the human race would last for between 5100 and 7.8 million years. (Brandon Carter's alternative form of the Doomsday argument was delivered earlier that year, but Gott's derivation was independent.)

He made a major effort subsequently to defend his form of the Doomsday argument from a variety of philosophical attacks, and this debate (like the feasibility of closed time loops) is still ongoing. To popularize the Copernicus method, Gott gave The New Yorker magazine a 95% confidence interval for the closing time of forty-four Broadway and Off Broadway productions based only on their opening dates.

== Education work ==
He received the President's Award for Distinguished Teaching in acknowledgment of his work on the National Westinghouse/Intel Science Talent Search high school student science competition. He is an active promoter of the public awareness of science at the popular level, and Princeton students have voted him the school's outstanding professor several times.

Gott was born in Louisville, Kentucky. He is a Presbyterian who distinguishes physical from metaphysical questions by their teleology; he believes that his writings are entirely scientific (not trespassing into theology) because the motivation for the way things are (or might be) is never examined.

== See also ==
- Kip Thorne's writings on wormhole time travel marked the introduction of the subject's serious discussion in physics
- Regular pseudopolyhedrons, infinite periodic polyhedra in 3-space
