= Dennis Dieks =

Dutch physicist and philosopher of physics

Dennis Geert Bernardus Johan Dieks (born 1 June 1949, in Amsterdam) is a Dutch physicist and philosopher of physics.

== Work ==
In 1982 he proved the no-cloning theorem (independently discovered in the same year by William Wootters and Wojciech H. Zurek, and many years before (1970) by James L. Park). In 1989 he proposed a new interpretation of quantum mechanics, later known as a version of the modal interpretation of quantum mechanics. He also worked on the philosophy of space and time, the logic of probabilistic reasoning, and the theory of explanation. Dieks is a professor at Utrecht University and a member of the Royal Netherlands Academy of Arts and Sciences since 2008. He is also a member of the Académie Internationale de Philosophie des Sciences and the Royal Holland Society of Sciences and Humanities. He was co-editor of the journal Studies in History and Philosophy of Modern Physics, and is an editor of the journal Foundations of Physics (Editor-in-chief C. Rovelli) and co-editor of the book series European Studies in Philosophy of Science (Springer). In 2024, he received the Langerhuizen oeuvre prize from the Royal Holland Society of Sciences and Humanities (Koninklijke Hollandsche Maatschappij der Wetenschappen). Dennis Dieks was appointed Knight in the Order of the Netherlands Lion in 2026.

Dieks was also an able chess player, reaching a maximum Elo rating of 2290 in 1974 and even beating Jan Timman in a game played in 1977.
