= Planetarium hypothesis =

Proposed solution to the Fermi paradox

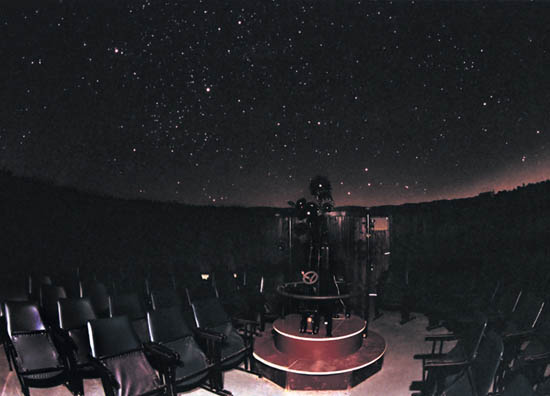
(Belgrade Planetarium, Serbia)

The planetarium hypothesis, conceived in 2001 by Stephen Baxter, attempts to provide a solution to the Fermi paradox by holding that our astronomical observations represent an illusion, created by a Type III civilization capable of manipulating matter and energy on galactic scales. He postulates that we do not see evidence of extraterrestrial life because the universe has been engineered so that it appears empty of other life.

== Background ==
There is no reliable or reproducible evidence that aliens have visited Earth. No transmissions or evidence of intelligent extraterrestrial life have been detected or observed anywhere other than Earth in the Universe. This runs counter to the knowledge that the Universe is filled with a very large number of planets, some of which likely hold the conditions hospitable for life. Life on Earth has shown the tendency to typically expand until it fills all available niches. These contradictory facts form the basis for the Fermi paradox, of which the planetarium hypothesis is one proposed solution.

== Criticism ==
The hypothesis has been considered by some authors as speculative and even next to useless in any practical scientific sense and more related to the theological mode of thinking along with the zoo hypothesis.
