= Aestivation (disambiguation) =

Aestivation may refer to:

- Aestivation, a state of animal dormancy, similar to hibernation
- Aestivation (botany), the positional arrangement of the parts of a flower within a flower bud before it has opened
- Aestivation hypothesis, a hypothesized solution to the Fermi paradox
