= Uniformity =

Uniformity may refer to:

- Distribution uniformity, a measure of how uniformly water is applied to the area being watered
- Religious uniformity, the promotion of one state religion, denomination, or philosophy to the exclusion of all other religious beliefs
- Retention uniformity, a concept in thin layer chromatography
- Tire uniformity, a concept in vehicle technology
- Uniformity (chemistry), a measure of the homogeneity of a substance's composition or character
- Uniformity (complexity), a concept in computational complexity theory
- Uniformity (philosophy), the concept that the same natural laws and processes that operate in the universe now have always operated in the universe
- Uniformity (topology), a concept in the mathematical field of topology
- Uniformity of motive, a concept in astrobiology

== See also ==
- Uniform (disambiguation)
- Diversity (disambiguation)
