= Hart–Tipler conjecture =

Idea that there is no evidence of aliens because they do not exist

The Hart–Tipler conjecture is the idea that an absence of detectable Von Neumann probes is contrapositive evidence that no intelligent life exists outside of the Solar System. This idea was first proposed in opposition to the Drake equation in a 1975 paper by Michael H. Hart titled "Explanation for the Absence of Extraterrestrials on Earth". Assuming that the probes traveled at 1/10 the speed of light and that no time was lost in building new ships upon arriving at the destination, Hart surmised that a wave of Von Neumann probes could cross the galaxy in approximately 650,000 years, a comparatively minimal span of time relative to the estimated age of the universe at 13.7 billion years. Hart’s argument was extended by cosmologist Frank Tipler in his 1981 paper entitled "Extraterrestrial intelligent beings do not exist". Tipler's article prompted a response from Drake, as well as peers like Gregory Benford and John Daugman.

The conjecture is the first of many proposed solutions to the Fermi paradox (the conflict between the lack of obvious evidence for alien life and various high probability estimates for its existence). In this case, the solution is that there is no other intelligent life because such estimates are incorrect. The conjecture is named after astrophysicist Michael H. Hart and mathematical physicist and cosmologist Frank Tipler.

== Background ==
There is no reliable or reproducible evidence that aliens have visited Earth. No transmissions or evidence of intelligent extraterrestrial life have been detected or observed anywhere other than Earth in the Universe. If intelligent life existed, it would have produced enough self-replicating spacecraft, known as von Neumann probes, to cover the universe by now, which runs counter to the knowledge that the Universe is filled with a very large number of planets, some of which likely hold the conditions hospitable for life. Life typically expands until it fills all available niches. These contradictory facts form the basis for the Fermi paradox, of which the Hart–Tipler conjecture is one proposed solution.

== Relationship to other proposed Fermi paradox solutions ==
The firstborn hypothesis is a special case of the Hart–Tipler conjecture which states that no other intelligent life has been discovered because humanity is the first intelligent life in the universe. According to the Berserker hypothesis, the absence of interstellar probes is not evidence of life's absence, since such probes could "go berserk" and destroy other civilizations, before self-destructing.
