= Uniformity of motive =

In astrobiology, uniformity of motive is an essential assumption of the zoo hypothesis explanation to Fermi's paradox. The zoo hypothesis states that alien civilizations refrain from contacting Earth, so as to not interfere in natural evolution and cultural development, or to minimize risk for themselves. Certain technological, political or ethical thresholds and standards could be implemented for other civilizations to pass, after which contact would be established.

In the likely case that more than one sufficiently developed alien civilizations exist, a uniformity of motive with legal policy concerning the contact of newly developing civilizations would have to be established and maintained. A "galactic club" would be formed and maintained, possibly by an early advanced civilization. The size of a club like this would influence the likelihood of compliance by all members, since any member could break the contact rules at any point in time, making large galactic clubs unlikely to succeed in their goals.

== Plausibility of the assumption ==
The concept of Uniformity of Motive is not a widely researched topic, as it would only resolve Fermi's paradox when all extraterrestrial civilizations would abide by the rule to not contact ‘lesser developed’ civilizations, such as Earth. Additionally, the Uniformity of Motive is purely based on assumptions and is therefore a hard hypothesis to scientifically confirm or reject.

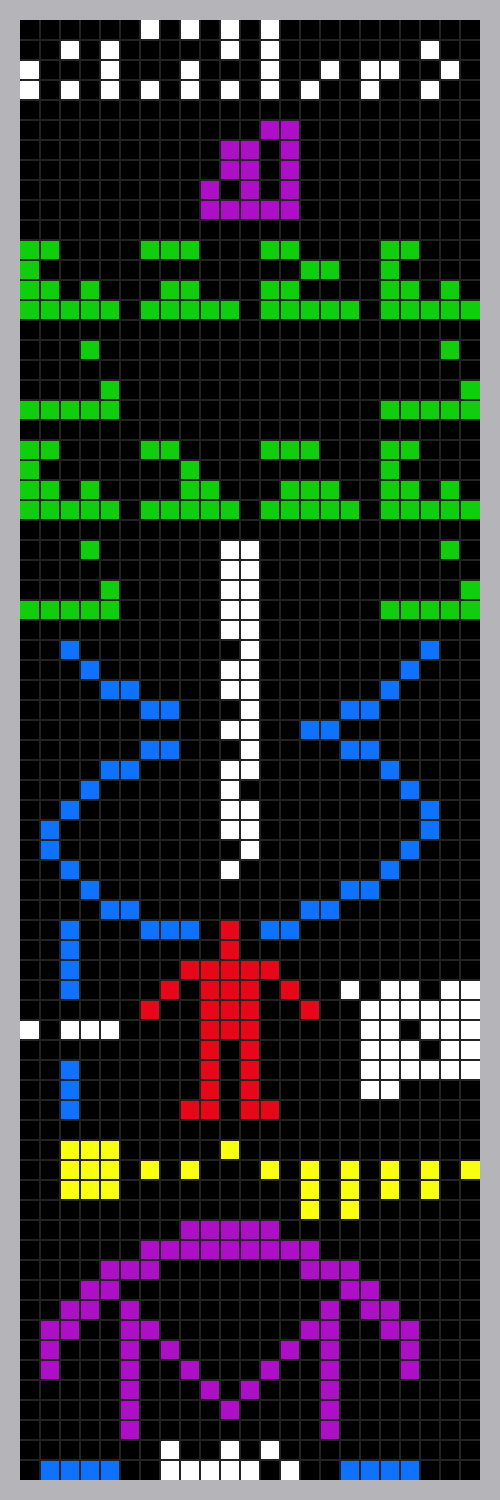
The Arecibo message from 1974 is an example of a message that represents humankind. It was broadcast into globular star cluster M13.

Thomas Hair (2011) researches the idea that, given that Earth is a relatively young planet, older extraterrestrial civilizations would likely follow the lead of an even older civilization - the first civilization to come up with a Uniformity of Motive (as originally proposed by Ronald Bracewell). He calculates using Monte Carlo simulations that there would be an enormous time gap between the first civilization and the emergence of Earth, During that time span, a first civilization could spread its rule throughout the galaxy. Still, the uniformity of motive is a difficult galactic rule to uphold when most extraterrestrial civilizations are scattered over thousands of light years, restricted by natural speed laws. Due to the number of civilizations that could be present in our galaxy, the assumption of a uniformity of motive would be arguable, proposes Duncan Forgan. Forgan reconsiders this idea that the galaxy would be rather made up of Galactic Cliques with similarly evolved cultural norms than one big Galactic Club.

== Convergent cultural evolution ==
Convergent cultural evolution could explain the emergence of uniform motives in a possible Galactic Club. This convergence on a certain set of cultural norms and ethics might be a necessary condition for civilizations to reach sufficient developmental stages for space exploration and communication, since the environmental pressures of intergalactic travel and communication are similar for all alien civilizations. Under this assumption, the concept of a Galactic Club with Uniformity of Motive would gain plausibility.

== Earth law on extraterrestrial contact ==
Space can be explored and used freely by all United Nations States according to the Outer Space Treaty from 1967. However, the United Nations have no specific laws on initiating contact with other extraterrestrial civilizations, apart from three important principles to follow when doing so (as quoted from the source):

1. The decision on whether or not to send a message to extraterrestrial intelligence should be made by an appropriate international body, broadly representative of Humankind.
2. If a decision is made to send a message to extraterrestrial intelligence, it should be sent on behalf of all Humankind, rather than from individual States or groups.
3. The content of such a message should be developed through an appropriate international process, reflecting a broad consensus.

There have been multiple attempts to contact alien civilizations, of which the most notable examples are the Voyager probes.

The International Academy of Astronautics has prepared a SETI detection protocol to follow that is in accordance with all International Space Law of the United Nations. The detection of possible alien life should first be validated. If the detection appears to be real, then the discoverer should seek contact with the national authorities and other research organizations so they can conduct independent research on the observations. The United Nations and consequently the public will be contacted after.
