= Uniform (disambiguation) =

A uniform is a standard set of clothing identifying the wearer as a member of an organisation.

Uniform may also refer to:

== Clothing ==
- Baseball uniform
- Military uniform, often simply "uniform", worn by members of a military organisation
- School uniform, also known as "student uniform" or simply "uniform", mandated clothing for students in a particular school or school system

== Music and film ==
- Uniform (band), American rock band
- Uniform (film) is the title of a 2003 film by director Diao Yi'nan
- "Uniform", a song by Joe Beagle
- "Uniform", a track on British band Bloc Party's album A Weekend in the City
- "Uniform", a 1982 single by Icehouse, from the album Primitive Man
- "Uniform", a 1994 single by Inspiral Carpets, from the album Devil Hopping

== Mathematics and physics ==
- Uniform circular motion, in physics
- Uniform continuity of a function is a property stronger than ordinary continuity
- Uniform convergence of an infinite sequence of functions is a type of convergence stronger than pointwise convergence
- Uniform distribution (continuous)
- Uniform distribution (discrete)
- Uniform limit theorem
- Uniform property, concept in topology
- Uniform space, concept in topology

== Other uses ==
- Uniform, the phonetic code word for the letter "U" as part of the NATO phonetic alphabet

== See also ==
- Uniformity (disambiguation)
