= Quiet and loud aliens =

Concept in astrobiology

The concept of quiet and loud aliens is used in the modelling of hypotheses for the prevalence of extraterrestrial intelligence, particularly in the context of the Fermi Paradox. Hypothetical "loud" aliens expand their sphere of influence rapidly in a highly detectable way; hypothetical "quiet" aliens are hard or impossible to detect. A special type of loud alien civilizations are "grabby aliens" who also inhibit the development of other technological civilizations in their sphere of influence.

Walter Barta argues that Robin Hanson's grabby aliens model creates an anthropic dilemma. According to the model, most observers in our reference class should be grabby aliens themselves. This leads to the question of why we do not find ourselves as grabby aliens, but rather as a species confined to a single planet.

== See also ==
- Anthropic principle
- Dark forest hypothesis
- Search for extraterrestrial intelligence
