= Firstborn hypothesis =

Idea that humanity is the first intelligent life

The firstborn hypothesis is a proposed solution to the Fermi paradox which states that no extraterrestrial intelligent life has been discovered because humanity is the first form of intelligent life in the universe. Thus, since it posits that there is no intelligent life outside of the solar system, it can be considered to be under the aegis of the Hart-Tipler conjecture.

== Background ==
There is no reliable or reproducible evidence that aliens have visited Earth. No transmissions or evidence of intelligent extraterrestrial life have been observed anywhere other than Earth in the universe. This runs counter to the knowledge that the universe is filled with a very large number of planets, some of which likely hold the conditions hospitable for life. Life typically expands until it fills all available niches. These contradictory facts form the basis for the Fermi paradox, of which the firstborn hypothesis is one proposed solution.

Avi Loeb, an astrophysicist and cosmologist, has suggested that Earth may be a very early example of a life-bearing planet and that life-bearing planets may be more likely trillions of years from now. He has put forward the view that the Universe has only recently reached a state in which life becomes possible and this is the reason humanity has not detected extraterrestrial life.

== Relationship to other proposed Fermi paradox solutions ==
The firstborn hypothesis is a special case of the Hart–Tipler conjecture (the idea that the lack of evidence for interstellar probes is evidence that no intelligent life other than humanity exists in the universe) which asserts a time-dependent curve towards discovery. The firstborn hypothesis is also a special time-dependent case of the rare Earth hypothesis, which states that conditions for creating intelligent life are exceedingly rare.
