= Extraterrestrial intelligence =

Hypothetical intelligent extraterrestrial life

Extraterrestrial intelligence (ETI) refers to hypothetical beings – extraterrestrial life or more artificial beings – having the intelligence to perform similar cognitive abilities as humans. No such life has ever been verifiably observed to exist. The question of whether other inhabited worlds might exist has been debated since ancient history. The modern form of the concept emerged when the Copernican Revolution demonstrated that the Earth was a planet revolving around the Sun, and other planets were, conversely, other worlds. The question of whether other inhabited planets or moons exist was a natural consequence of this new understanding. It has become one of the most speculative questions in science and is a central theme of both science fiction and popular culture.

An alternative name for it is "Extraterrestrial Technological Instantiations" (ETI). The term was coined to avoid the use of terms such as "civilizations", "species", and "intelligence", as those may prove to be ambiguous and open to interpretation, or simply inapplicable in its local context.

The search for extraterrestrial intelligence relies on technosignatures, the detectable effects of alien technological civilizations.

== Intelligence ==
Intelligence is, along with the more precise concept of sapience, used to describe extraterrestrial life with similar cognitive abilities as humans. Another interchangeable term is sophoncy, being wise or wiser, coined by Karen Anderson and published in the 1966 works by her husband Poul Anderson.

Sentience, like consciousness, is a concept sometimes mistakenly used to refer to the concept of intelligence and sapience, since it does not exclude forms of life that are non-sapient (or more broadly non-intelligent or non-conscious).

The term extraterrestrial civilization frames a more particular case of extraterrestrial intelligence. It is the possible long-term result of intelligent and specifically sapient extraterrestrial life.

== Probability ==
The Copernican principle is generalized to the relativistic concept that humans are not privileged observers of the universe. Many prominent scientists, including Stephen Hawking have proposed that the sheer scale of the universe makes it improbable for intelligent life not to have emerged elsewhere. However, Fermi's Paradox highlights the apparent contradiction between high estimates of the probability of the existence of extraterrestrial civilization and humanity's lack of contact with, or evidence for, such civilizations.

So far, there is no observation of extraterrestrial life, including intelligent extraterrestrial life.

The Kardashev scale is a speculative method of measuring a civilization's level of technological advancement, based on the amount of energy a civilization is able to utilize.

The Drake equation is a probabilistic framework used to estimate the number of active, communicative extraterrestrial civilizations in the Milky Way galaxy. A 2020 study estimated that there could be about 36 alien civilizations in the Milky Way today. With 36 "communicating extra-terrestrial intelligent" civilizations, the average distance would be around 17,000 light-years. However, it is conceivable that some civilizations have created machines, probes or similar systems that outlast them.

== Search for extraterrestrial intelligence ==
There has been a search for signals from extraterrestrial intelligence for several decades, with no significant results. Active SETI (Active Search for Extra-Terrestrial Intelligence) is the attempt to send messages to intelligent extraterrestrial life. Active SETI messages are usually sent in the form of radio signals. Physical messages like that of the Pioneer plaque may also be considered an active SETI message.

Communication with extraterrestrial intelligence (CETI) is a branch of the search for extraterrestrial intelligence that focuses on composing and deciphering messages that could theoretically be understood by another technological civilization. The best-known CETI experiment was the 1974 Arecibo message composed by Frank Drake and Carl Sagan. There are multiple independent organizations and individuals engaged in CETI research.

The U.S. government's position, in line with that of most relevant experts, is that "chances of contact with an extraterrestrial intelligence are extremely small, given the distances involved." This line of thinking has led some to conclude that first contact might be made with extraterrestrial artificial intelligence, rather than with biological beings.

The Wow! signal remains the best candidate for an extraterrestrial radio signal ever detected, though the fact that no similar signal has ever been observed again makes attribution of the signal to any cause difficult if not impossible.

On 14 June 2022 astronomers working with China's FAST telescope reported the possibility of having detected artificial (presumably alien) signals, but cautions that further studies are required to determine if some kind of natural radio interference may be the source. On 18 June 2022 Dan Werthimer, chief scientist for several SETI-related projects, reportedly noted that “These signals are from radio interference; they are due to radio pollution from earthlings, not from E.T.”

== Potential cultural impact of extraterrestrial contact ==
The potential changes from extraterrestrial contact could vary greatly in magnitude and type, based on the extraterrestrial civilization's level of technological advancement, degree of benevolence or malevolence, and level of mutual comprehension between itself and humanity. Some theories suggest that an extraterrestrial civilization could be advanced enough to dispense with biology, living instead inside of advanced computers. The medium through which humanity is contacted, be it electromagnetic radiation, direct physical interaction, extraterrestrial artefact, or otherwise, may also influence the results of contact. Incorporating these factors, various systems have been created to assess the implications of extraterrestrial contact.

The implications of extraterrestrial contact, particularly with a technologically superior civilization, have often been likened to the meeting of two vastly different human cultures on Earth, a historical precedent being the Columbian Exchange. Such meetings have generally led to the destruction of the civilization receiving contact (as opposed to the "contactor", which initiates contact), and therefore destruction of human civilization is a possible outcome. However, the absence of any such contact to date means such conjecture is largely speculative.

== UFOlogy ==
The extraterrestrial hypothesis is the idea that some UFOs are vehicles containing or sent by extraterrestrial beings (usually called aliens in this context). As an explanation for UFOs, ETI is sometimes contrasted with EDI (extradimensional intelligence), for example by J. Allen Hynek. In 2023, United States House of Representatives lawmakers held a hearing to examine how the American executive branch handles reports of UFOs.

== In culture ==
The theories and reception of the probability of intelligent life has been a recurring cultural element, especially of popular culture since the prospect and achievement of spaceflight. New Mexico has even declared in 2003 the 14th of February as the Extraterrestrial Culture Day.

== See also ==
- Extraterrestrial life
  - Rare Earth hypothesis
  - Cosmic pluralism
  - Fermi Paradox
- Extraterrestrials in fiction
  - First contact (science fiction)
  - Contact (1997 film)
- Life origination beyond planets
- Habitable zone for complex life
- Messaging to Extra-Terrestrial Intelligence (METI or Active SETI)
- Quiet and loud aliens
- Sapience
- Sentiocentrism
- Extraterrestrial: The First Sign of Intelligent Life Beyond Earth, 2021 popular science book by Avi Loeb
