= Zoo hypothesis =

Hypothesis concerning lack of extraterrestrial contact with Earth

The zoo hypothesis speculates on the assumed behavior and existence of technologically advanced extraterrestrial life and the reasons they refrain from contacting Earth. It is one of many theoretical explanations for the Fermi paradox. The hypothesis states that extraterrestrial life intentionally avoids communication with Earth to allow for natural evolution and sociocultural development, and avoiding interplanetary contamination, similar to people observing animals at a zoo. The hypothesis seeks to explain the apparent absence of extraterrestrial life despite its generally accepted plausibility and hence the reasonable expectation of its existence.

Extraterrestrial life forms might, for example, choose to allow contact once the human species has passed certain technological, political, and/or ethical standards. Alternatively, they may withhold contact until humans force contact upon them, possibly by sending a spacecraft to an extraterrestrial-inhabited planet. In this regard, reluctance to initiate contact could reflect a sensible desire to minimize risk. An extraterrestrial society with advanced remote-sensing technologies may conclude that direct contact with neighbors confers added risks to itself without an added benefit. A variant on the zoo hypothesis suggested by former MIT Haystack Observatory scientist John Allen Ball is the "laboratory" hypothesis, in which humanity is being subjected to experiments, with Earth serving as a giant laboratory. Ball describes this hypothesis as "morbid" and "grotesque", simultaneously overlooking the possibility that such experiments may be altruistic, i.e., designed to accelerate the pace of civilization to overcome a tendency for intelligent life to destroy itself, until a species is sufficiently developed to establish contact.

== Assumptions ==
The zoo hypothesis assumes, first, that whenever the conditions are such that life can exist and evolve, it will, and secondly, there are many places where life can exist and a large number of extraterrestrial cultures in existence. It also assumes that these extraterrestrials have great reverence for independent, natural evolution and development. In particular, assuming that intelligence is a physical process that acts to maximize the diversity of a system's accessible futures, a fundamental motivation for the zoo hypothesis would be that premature contact would "unintelligently" reduce the overall diversity of paths the universe itself could take.

These ideas are perhaps most plausible if there is a relatively universal cultural or legal policy among a plurality of extraterrestrial civilizations necessitating isolation with respect to civilizations at Earth-like stages of development. In a universe without a hegemonic power, random single civilizations with independent principles would make contact. This makes a crowded universe with clearly defined rules seem more plausible.

If there is a plurality of extraterrestrial cultures, however, this theory may break down under the uniformity of motive concept because it would take just a single extraterrestrial civilization, or simply a small group within any given civilisation, to decide to act contrary to the imperative within human range of detection for it to be undone, and the probability of such a violation of hegemony increases with the number of civilizations. This idea, however, becomes more plausible if all civilizations tend to evolve similar cultural standards and values with regard to contact much like convergent evolution on Earth has independently evolved eyes on numerous occasions, or all civilizations follow the lead of some particularly distinguished civilization, such as the first civilization among them.

In this hypothesis, the problem of universal ethical homogeneity is solved because the acquisition of a persistent advanced level of civilization requires overcoming many problems, such as self-destruction, war, overpopulation, pollution, and scarcity. Managing to solve these problems could guide a civilization to adopt a responsible and wise behavior, otherwise they would disappear (involving other solutions to the Fermi paradox). In the zoo hypothesis, no contact would be possible until humanity had acquired a certain level of civilization and maturity (responsibility and wisdom), otherwise it would become a potential threat.

One estimate for when humanity might be able to test the zoo hypothesis, essentially by eliminating ways technological extraterrestrials within the galaxy may be able to hide, is some time within the next half century.

== Fermi paradox ==
A modified zoo hypothesis is a possible solution to the Fermi paradox. The time between the emergence of the first civilization within the Milky Way and all subsequent civilizations could be enormous. Monte Carlo simulation shows the first few inter-arrival times between emergent civilizations would be similar in length to geologic epochs on Earth. The zoo hypothesis assumes a civilization may have a ten-million, one-hundred-million, or half-billion-year head start on humanity, i.e., it may have the capability to completely negate our best attempts to detect it.

The zoo hypothesis relies in part on applying the concept of hegemonic power to the Fermi paradox. Even if a first hegemonic non-interventionist grand civilization (first civilization) is long gone, their initial legacy could persist in the form of a passed-down tradition, or perhaps in an artificial lifeform (artificial superintelligence) dedicated to a non-interventionist hegemonic goal without the risk of death. Thus, the hegemonic power does not even have to be the first civilization, but simply the first to spread its non-interventionist doctrine and control over a large volume of the galaxy. If just one civilization acquired hegemony in the distant past, it could form an unbroken chain of taboo against rapacious colonization in favour of non-interference in any civilizations that follow. The uniformity of motive concept previously mentioned would become moot in such a situation. The main problem would be how a galaxy-wide civilization would block Earth from receiving all intentional or unintentional communications.

Nonetheless, if the oldest civilization still present in the Milky Way has, for example, a 100-million-year time advantage over the next oldest civilization, then it is conceivable that they could be in the singular position of being able to control, monitor, influence or isolate the emergence of every civilization that follows within their sphere of influence. This is analogous to what happens on Earth within our own civilization on a daily basis, in that everyone born on this planet is born into a pre-existing system of familial associations, customs, traditions and laws that were already long established before our birth and which we have little or no control over.

== METI (Messaging Extraterrestrial Intelligence) ==
Overcoming the zoo hypothesis is one of the goals of METI, an organization created in 2015 to communicate with extraterrestrials, an active form of the search for extraterrestrials (SETI). METI, however, has been criticized for not representing humanity's collective will and for potentially endangering humanity.

== Criticism ==
Some critics of the hypothesis say that only a single dissident group in an extraterrestrial civilization, or alternatively the existence of galactic cliques instead of a unified galactic club, would be enough to break the pact of no contact. To Stephen Webb and others, it seems unlikely, taking humans and human intercivilizational politics as reference, that such prohibition would be in effect for millions of years or at least human existence without a single breach thereof. Others say that the zoo hypothesis, along with its planetarium variation, is highly speculative and more aligned with theological theories. One possible counterargument to the dissident (rogue) group argument is that extraterrestrial artificial superintelligences dominate space, including space occupied by biological intelligences; moreover, separate artificial superintelligences are assumed to tend towards a network of merged superintelligences, thereby dissuading rogue behaviour.

== Appearance in fiction ==
In the 1982 novel Life, the Universe and Everything, author Douglas Adams describes a fictional race of genocidal robots from the planet Krikkit who long ago instigated the massively destructive Krikkit Wars. The memories of the Krikkit Wars survived across time as a kind of racial memory, resurfacing on Earth as the game of cricket, which uses bats and wickets reminiscent of weapons used during the Krikkit Wars. As a result, Earth is seen as uncivilized and tasteless and is therefore shunned by all civilized species of the galaxy for glorifying this atrocity in their sport.

In the Star Trek franchise, created by Gene Roddenberry, the Prime Directive is a regulation enacted by the multi-species United Federation of Planets prohibiting interference with the natural development of civilizations, particularly those that have not yet achieved warp technology.

== See also ==
- Uncontacted peoples
