= Emil Konopinski =

American nuclear physicist (1911–1990)

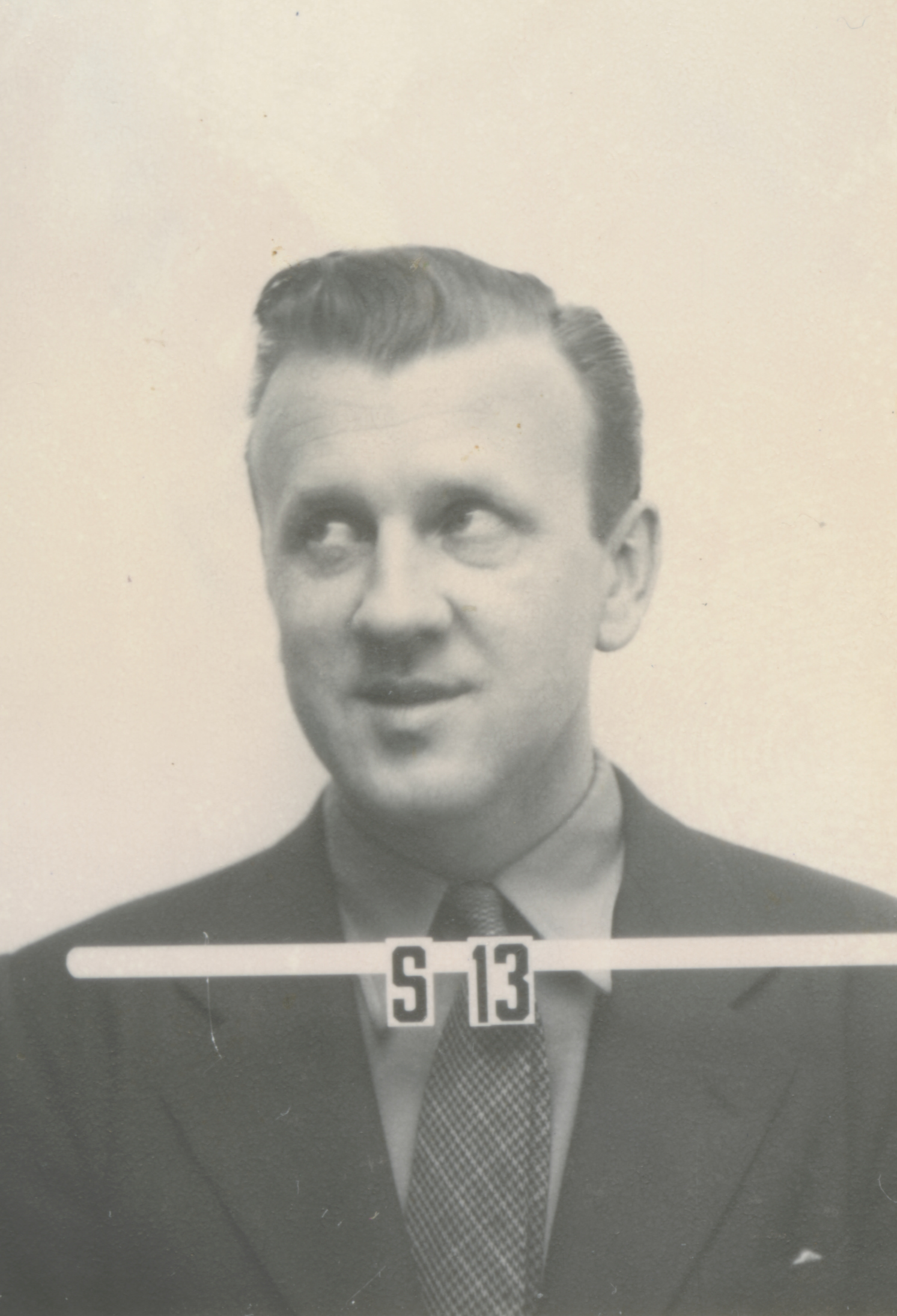
- Konopinski's Los Alamos Laboratory identity badge photo
- Born: Emil John Konopinski; December 25, 1911; Michigan City, Indiana, U.S.
- Died: May 26, 1990 (aged 78); Bloomington, Indiana, U.S.
- Education: University of Michigan (Ph.D)
- Scientific career
- Fields: Theoretical physics; Nuclear physics
- Workplaces: Indiana University
- Thesis: A Synopsis of Theoretical Considerations Concerning the Continuous Beta-Ray-Spectra (1936)
- Doctoral advisor: George Uhlenbeck
- Doctoral students: Eugene Greuling

Emil John (Jan) Konopinski (December 25, 1911 in Michigan City, Indiana – May 26, 1990 in Bloomington, Indiana) was an American nuclear scientist of Polish descent. His parents were Joseph and Sophia (née Sniegowska).

He was, with George Uhlenbeck as thesis advisor, a 1934 Ph.D. graduate of the University of Michigan, and later a professor of physics at Indiana University. His doctoral students include Eugene Greuling. During WW II Konopinski collaborated with Enrico Fermi on the first nuclear reactor at the University of Chicago. He also joined the Manhattan Project to develop the first nuclear weapon (atomic bomb).

He, together with C. Marvin and Edward Teller, showed that a thermonuclear explosion would not ignite the atmosphere and thereby destroy the earth.

An Atomic Energy Commission consultant from 1946 to 1968, he wrote a book entitled The Theory of Beta Radioactivity.
