= Stephen Webb (scientist) =

Physicist/Author – Where Are All The Aliens?

Stephen Webb Ph.D. (physics)
- Stephen Webb
- Born: February 25, 1963 (age 63); Middlesbrough, North Yorkshire, England
- Education: Bristol University (BSc (Hons) Physics – First Class); Manchester University (PhD – Theoretical Particle Physics)
- Known for: Numerous Science and Math books, including If the Universe Is Teeming with Aliens . . . Where is Everybody?, as well as academic publications
- Scientific career
- Institutions: University of Portsmouth
- Website: https://www.stephenswebb.com

Stephen Webb (born February 25, 1963) is a physicist and author of numerous popular science and math books, as well as academic publications. Webb was educated at Bristol University (BSc (Hons) Physics – First Class) and, as a graduate student, attended Manchester University (PhD – Theoretical Particle Physics). Webb is currently on the academic staff at the University of Portsmouth, and is a presenter of numerous science-related non-academic talks and academic lectures. In 2018, Webb was a featured science speaker at the annual TED conference.

Webb has worked at the University of Cardiff (Physics Department; 1993–95), University of Sheffield (Math & Statistics; 1995–98), University of Loughborough (Math & Sciences; 1998–99), Northumbria University (Information Sciences; 1999–2000), The Open University (2000–2006) and the University of Portsmouth (2006–current). In addition, Webb has been a Member of the Institute of Physics (M. Inst. P.), Chartered Physicist (C. Phys.), Senior Fellow of the Higher Education Academy (SFHEA), a Member of international editorial board (Springer S&F Series), Member of the UK SETI Research Network, and a Project lead for the UK Advance HE Collaborative Award in Teaching Excellence (CATE 2022).

== Publications ==
=== Authored books ===
- Webb, Stephen (2023). Around the World in 80 Ways: Exploring Our Planet Through Maps and Data (Hardcover). United Kingdom: Springer. ISBN 978-3031024399.
- Webb, Stephen (2018). Clash of Symbols: A ride through the riches of glyphs 1st ed. 2018 Edition. United Kingdom: Springer. ISBN 978-3319713496.
- Webb, Stephen (2015). If the Universe Is Teeming with Aliens . . . Where Is Everybody? - Seventy-Five Solutions to the Fermi Paradox and the Problem of Extraterrestrial Life - 2nd Edition. United Kingdom: Springer. ISBN 978-3319132358.
- Webb, Stephen (2012). New Eyes on the Universe: Twelve Cosmic Mysteries and the Tools We Need to Solve Them (Springer Praxis Books) 2012th Edition. United Kingdom: Springer. ISBN 978-1461421931.
- Webb, Stephen (2004). Out of this World: Colliding Universes, Branes, Strings, and Other Wild Ideas of Modern Physics 2004th Edition. United Kingdom: Copernicus Books. ISBN 978-0387029306.
- Webb, Stephen (2002). If the Universe Is Teeming with Aliens . . . Where Is Everybody? - Seventy-Five Solutions to the Fermi Paradox and the Problem of Extraterrestrial Life - 1st Edition. United Kingdom: Copernicus Books. ISBN 978-0387955018.
- Webb, Stephen (1999). Measuring the Universe: The Cosmological Distance Ladder (Springer Praxis Books) 1999th Edition. United Kingdom: Springer. ISBN 978-1852331061.

=== Edited books ===
- Webb, Stephen (2021). Instant expert: what is the Fermi paradox? – in: All About Space, vol 113, pp 46–47.
- Webb, Stephen (2017). Book review: Learning Analytics Explained – in: Innovations in Education and Teaching International, vol 54(6), pp. 625–6.
- Webb, Stephen (2015). The alpha magnetic spectrometer – in: Patrick Moore's Yearbook of Astronomy 2016, edited by Moore, P. and Mason, J., pp237–256). London: Macmillan Press.
