= Carbon-based =

Carbon-based may refer to:

- Biology
- based on Carbon
- Carbon-based life
- Carbon chauvinism
