= 4587 =

4587 may refer to:

- Inmate 4587, Oliver Queen's prisoner number
- "Inmate 4587" (Arrow episode)
- 4587 Rees
