= Planetary chauvinism =

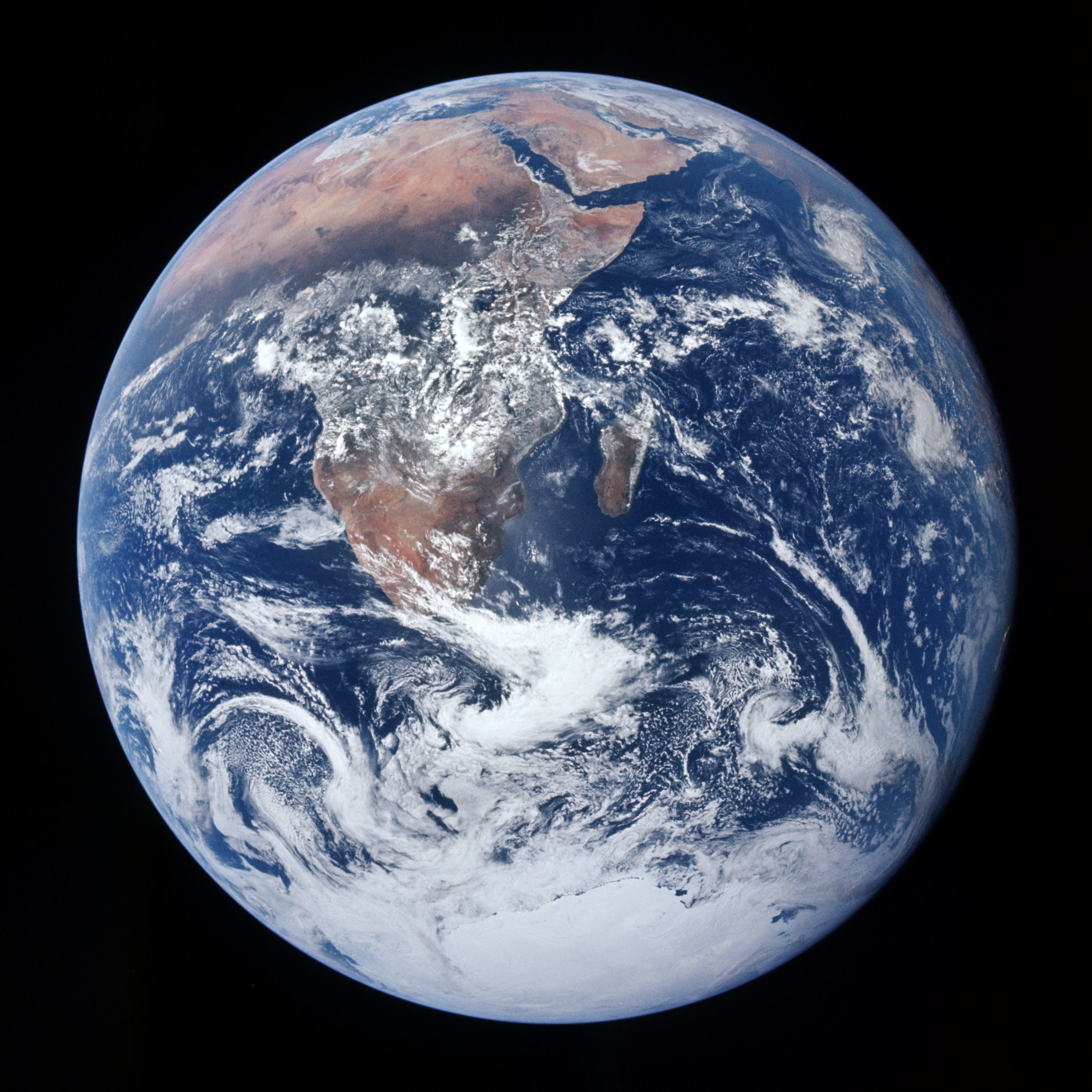
The Earth seen from Apollo 17.

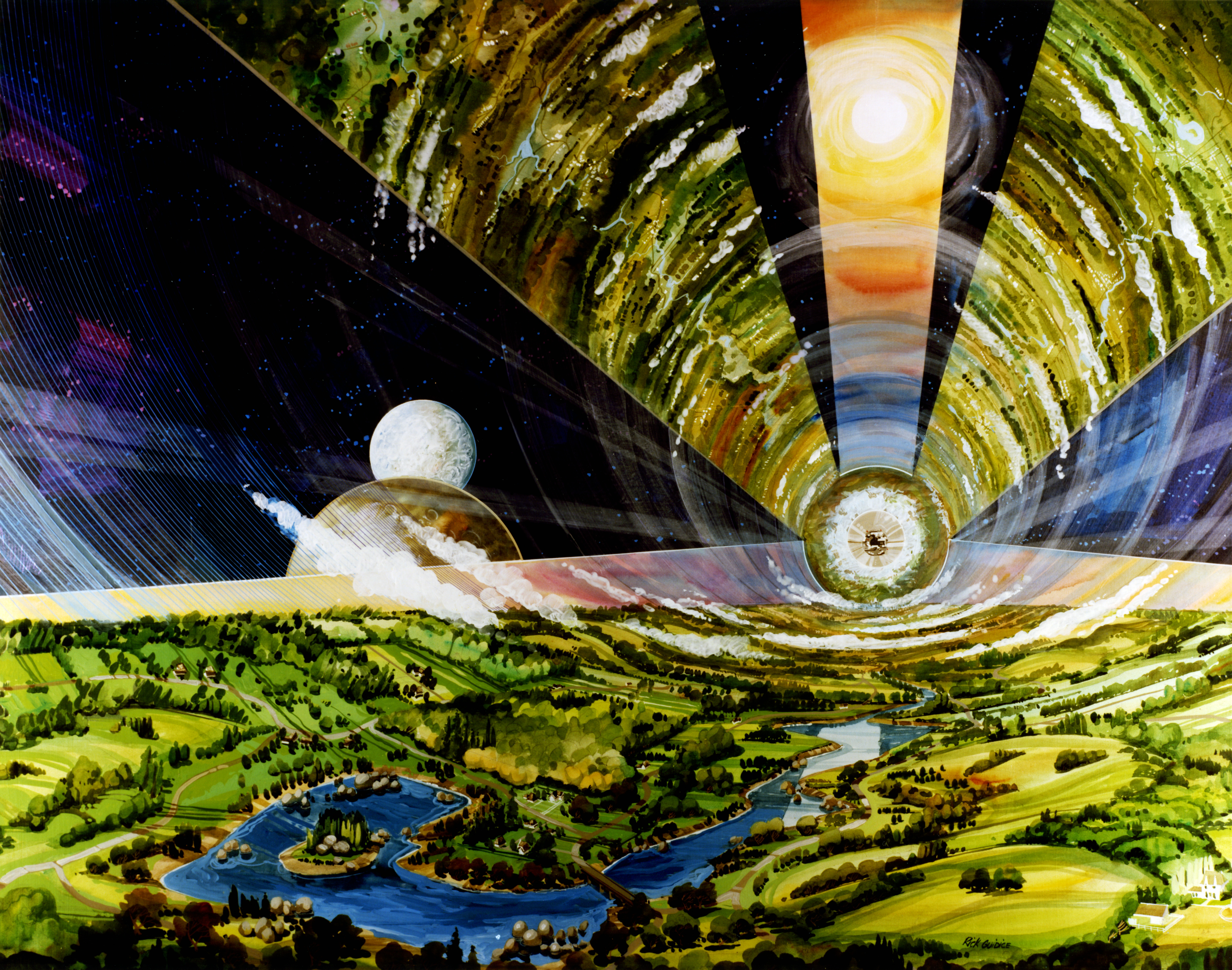
An example of an O'Neill cylinder, as envisioned by NASA Ames.

Planetary chauvinism is the belief that human society will always be planet-based (even if extended beyond Earth), and overlooks or ignores the potential benefits of space-based living. The idea can be extended to alien society in general, that is, we should expect alien society to be planet based. The coining of the term is often credited to Isaac Asimov, but in an interview with Bill Boggs, Asimov mentions that he heard it from Carl Sagan. The counter-argument is that all the benefits of a planet can be achieved in space, e.g., by an O'Neill cylinder-type structure.

An even narrower version of planetary chauvinism is G-star chauvinism. This is the assumption that intelligent life will always evolve in star systems similar to our own, that is, with stars of spectral class G. Carl Sagan criticised this belief on the grounds that intelligent life has a greater chance of evolving on the longest-lived stars. That suggests that class-M and class-K stars are more likely candidates, not only because of their lifetime, but also because they are far more numerous than class-G stars.

There are several hypotheses of the possibility of life originating in the universe in places other than planets.

== Surface chauvinism ==
Thomas Gold, who advocated for the possibility of life in deep biospheres below the surfaces of celestial bodies, has criticized science which only focuses on the surface and not below in its search of life as surface chauvinism.

Similarly, the focus on surface-bound and territorial space advocacy, particularly for space colonization, has been termed surfacism, neglecting interest for atmospheres and potential atmospheric human habitation, such as colonization above the surface of Venus.

== See also ==
- Anthropocentrism
- Carbon chauvinism
- Chauvinism
- Particle chauvinism
- Surface chauvinism and surfacism
