= On the Future =

2018 book by Martin Rees

On the Future: Prospects for Humanity
- Author: Martin Rees
- Language: English
- Genre: Science
- Published: October 16, 2018 (Princeton University Press)
- Publication place: United Kingdom
- Media type: Print (hardcover)
- Pages: 272
- ISBN: 9780691180441

On the Future: Prospects for Humanity is a 2018 nonfiction book by British cosmologist and Astronomer Royal Martin Rees. It is a short, "big concept" book on the future of humanity and on potential dangers, such as nuclear warfare, climate change, biotech, and artificial intelligence, and the possibility of human extinction.

== Ideas ==
As with his 2003 Our Final Hour, Rees warns that human civilization faces grave existential risks.

Rees considers a scenario 20 years from now, where carbon dioxide levels have continued to rise, and where climate models have improved. There is a possibility the improved models will predict imminent catastrophe, in which case there might emerge political pressure to immediately deploy poorly-understood geo-engineering techniques. In order to mitigate this "nightmare" scenario, Rees advocates that we start exploring these techniques now, so as to better understand their limitations, risks, and side effects.

Other risks include nuclear war, an asteroid strike, rogue biotechnology, or artificial intelligence. Rees advocates that nations empower supra-national institutions to better collaborate against such risks, a difficult task given the populist trends against globalism. Some scholars, such as Stephen Hawking, have advocated space colonization as a way to mitigate existential risk; Rees breaks with Hawking on this matter and criticizes space colonization as "a dangerous delusion to think that space offers an escape from Earth's problems".

== Reception ==
Vanity Fair assessed the book as "uncontroversial... written in a way that's accessible to the general reader, and sprinkled with moments of infectious awe." Scientific American recommended the book as a "spirited assessment of technology's role in shaping our future". Engineering & Technology assessed it as "short, but persuasive". A New Statesman review stated "Remarkably, what seems like an extended state-of-the-planet essay does not feel as depressing as it ought: Rees dispenses his apocalyptic overview of the coming decades like cocktail party wisdom". The Financial Times called it "crisply written"; Publishers Weekly called it "far-ranging but easily understood". Kirkus Reviews called it "A book to be read by anyone on Earth who cares about its future."

On November 23, 2018, the Israeli newspaper Yediot Aharonot reported that during a tense parliamentary debate in the Knesset, Prime Minister Netanyahu was observed engrossed in a copy of On The Future, marking passages and writing notes, and only occasionally raising his head to follow the ongoing debate in the plenum.
