= Martin Rees =

British astrophysicist (born 1942)

The Right Honourable The Lord Rees of Ludlow OM FRS HonFREng FMedSci FRAS HonFInstP
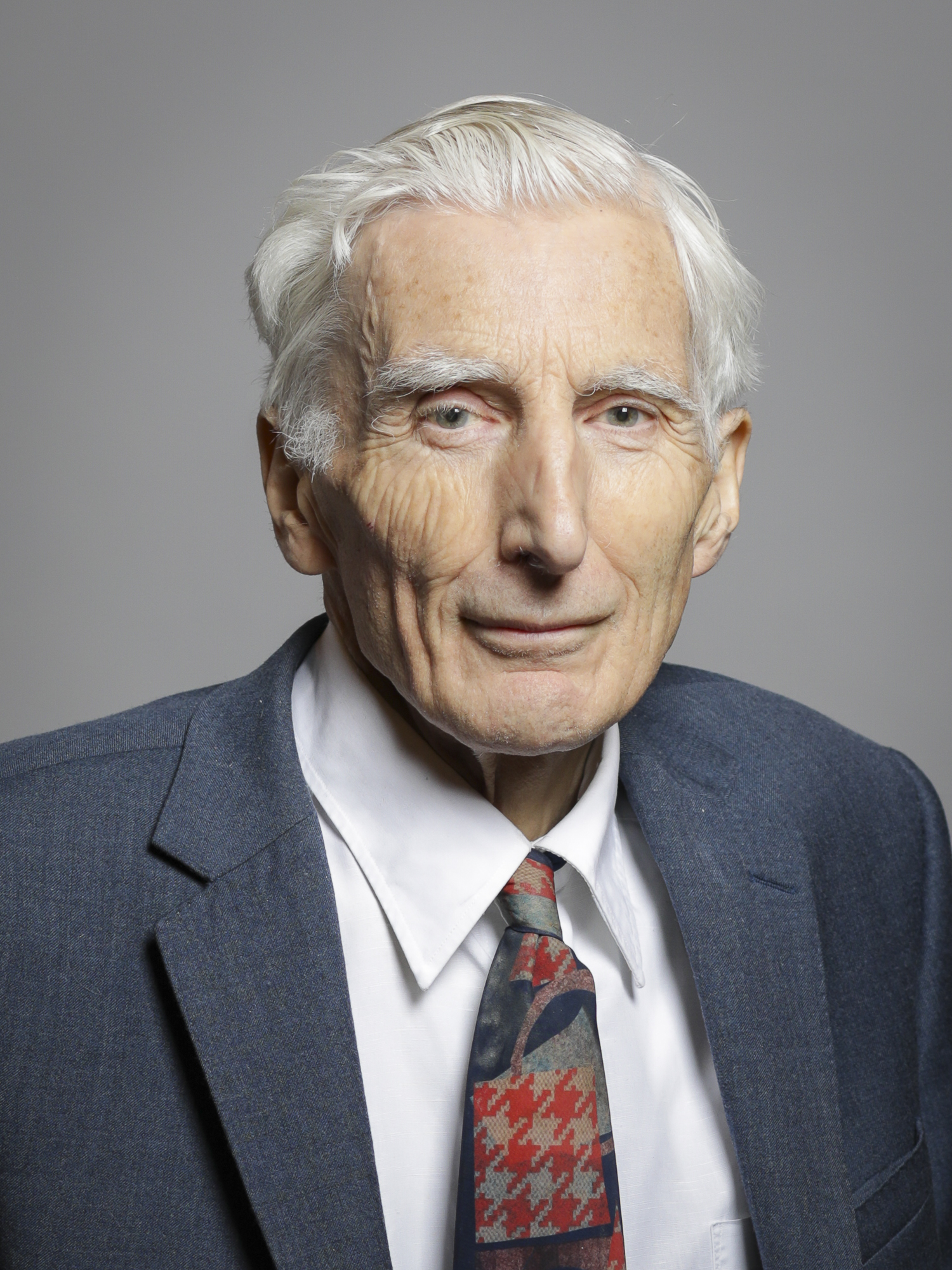
- Official portrait, 2019

15th Astronomer Royal
- In office 1995–2025
- Preceded by: Arnold Wolfendale
- Succeeded by: Michele Dougherty

60th President of the Royal Society
- In office 2005–2010
- Preceded by: The Lord May of Oxford
- Succeeded by: Paul Nurse

78th President of the Royal Astronomical Society
- In office 1992–1994
- Preceded by: Ken Pounds
- Succeeded by: Carole Jordan

39th Master of Trinity College, Cambridge
- In office 2004–2012
- Preceded by: Amartya Sen
- Succeeded by: Sir Gregory Winter

Member of the House of Lords
- Lord Temporal
- Life peerage 6 September 2005

Personal details
- Born: 23 June 1942 (age 84) York, England
- Party: None (crossbencher)
- Spouse(s): Dame Caroline Humphrey, Lady Rees (m. 1986)
- Website: www.ast.cam.ac.uk/~mjr/
- Scientific career
- Known for: Rees–Sciama effect 21-cm cosmology Coining particle chauvinism
- Awards: Dannie Heineman Prize for Astrophysics (1984); Gold Medal of the Royal Astronomical Society (1987); Balzan Prize (1989); Bower Award (1998); Gruber Prize in Cosmology (2001); Albert Einstein World Award of Science (2003); Michael Faraday Prize (2004); Crafoord Prize (2005); Order of Merit (2007); Templeton Prize (2011); Isaac Newton Medal (2012); Dalton Medal (2012); HonFREng (2007); Nierenberg Prize (2015); Fritz Zwicky Prize (2020); Copley Medal (2023); Wolf Prize in Physics (2024)
- Fields: Astronomy; Astrophysics
- Workplaces: University of Cambridge; University of Sussex
- Thesis: Physical processes in radio sources and inter-galactic medium (1967)
- Doctoral advisor: Dennis Sciama
- Doctoral students: Roger Blandford; Craig Hogan; Priyamvada Natarajan; James E. Pringle; Nick Kaiser
- Martin Rees's voice Recorded June 2010 from the BBC Radio 4 programme the Reith Lectures

Martin John Rees, Baron Rees of Ludlow, (born 23 June 1942) is a British cosmologist and astrophysicist. He was the fifteenth Astronomer Royal from 1995 to 2025, Master of Trinity College, Cambridge, from 2004 to 2012, and President of the Royal Society from 2005 to 2010. He has received various physics awards including the Wolf Prize in Physics in 2024 for fundamental contributions to high-energy astrophysics, galaxies and structure formation, and cosmology.

== Early life and education ==
Rees was born on 23 June 1942 in York, England. After a peripatetic life during the war, his parents, both teachers, settled with Rees, an only child, in a rural part of Shropshire near the border with Wales. There, his parents founded Bedstone College, a boarding school based on progressive educational concepts. He was educated at Bedstone College, then from the age of 13 at Shrewsbury School. He studied for the mathematical tripos at Trinity College, Cambridge, graduating with first class honours. He then undertook post-graduate research at Cambridge and completed a PhD supervised by Dennis Sciama in 1967. Rees's post-graduate work in astrophysics in the mid-1960s coincided with an explosion of new discoveries, with breakthroughs ranging from confirmation of the Big Bang, the discovery of neutron stars and black holes, and a host of other revelations.

== Career ==
After holding postdoctoral research positions in the United Kingdom and the United States, he was a professor at Sussex University, during 1972–1973. He later moved to Cambridge, where he was the Plumian Professor at the University of Cambridge until 1991, and the director of the Institute of Astronomy.

He was professor of astronomy at Gresham College, London, in 1975 and became a Fellow of the Royal Society in 1979. From 1992 to 2003, he was Royal Society Research Professor, and from 2003 Professor of Cosmology and Astrophysics. He was Master of Trinity College, Cambridge, during 2004–2012. He is an Honorary Fellow of Darwin College, King's College, Clare Hall, Robinson College and Jesus College, Cambridge. In 2003 he was elected foreign member of the Finnish Society of Sciences and Letters.

Rees is a member of the Board of the Institute for Advanced Study in Princeton, and the Oxford Martin School. He co-founded the Centre for the Study of Existential Risk and serves on the Scientific Advisory Board for the Future of Life Institute. He has formerly been a Trustee of the British Museum, the Science Museum, the Gates Cambridge Trust and the Institute for Public Policy Research (IPPR).

His doctoral students have included Roger Blandford, Craig Hogan, Nick Kaiser Priyamvada Natarajan, and James E. Pringle.

== Research ==
Rees is the author of more than 500 research papers. He is an author of books on astronomy and science intended for the lay public and gives many public lectures and broadcasts. In 2010 he was invited to deliver the Reith Lectures for the BBC, now published as From Here to Infinity: Scientific Horizons.

Rees has made contributions to the origin of cosmic microwave background radiation, as well as to galaxy clustering and formation. His studies of the distribution of quasars challenged the now-rejected steady state theory. He was one of the first to propose that enormous black holes power quasars, and that superluminal astronomical observations can be explained as an optical illusion caused by an object moving partly in the direction of the observer.

Since the 1990s, Rees has worked on gamma-ray bursts, especially in collaboration with Péter Mészáros, and on how the "cosmic dark ages" ended when the first stars formed. Since the 1970s he has been interested in anthropic reasoning, and the possibility that our visible universe is part of a vaster "multiverse".

== Public engagement ==
In addition to expansion of his scientific interests, Rees has written and spoken extensively about the problems and challenges of the 21st century, and interfaces between science, ethics, and politics.

In his books Our Final Hour and On the Future, Rees warns that humanity faces significant existential risks in the 21st century due to technological advancements, particularly in bioengineering and artificial intelligence. He estimated a 50% chance of human extinction during the 21st century, but remains optimistic that if the risks are successfully managed, technology could drastically improve standards of living.

In 2007, he delivered the Gifford Lectures on 21st Century Science: Cosmic Perspective and Terrestrial Challenges at the University of St Andrews. He made two TED talks on existential risks.

Rees thinks the search for extraterrestrial intelligence is worthwhile and has chaired the advisory board for the "Breakthrough Listen" project, a programme of SETI investigations funded by the Russian/US investor Yuri Milner.

In August 2014, Rees was one of 200 public figures who were signatories to a letter to The Guardian expressing their hope that Scotland would vote to remain part of the United Kingdom in September's referendum on that issue.

To mark the 300th anniversary of the Board of Longitude in 2014, he instigated a programme of new challenge prizes of £5-10m under the name "Longitude Prize 2014" for which he chairs the advisory board. The themes of the first two prizes are the reduction of inappropriate antibiotic use, and enhancing the safety and independence of dementia sufferers. The Longitude Prize on Dementia was announced in 2022.

In 2015, he was co-author of the report that launched the Global Apollo Programme, which calls for developed nations to commit to spending 0.02% of their GDP for 10 years, to fund coordinated research to make carbon-free baseload electricity less costly than electricity from coal by the year 2025.

In his general writings and in the House of Lords, his focus has been on the uses and abuses of advanced technology and on issues such as assisted dying, preservation of dark skies, and reforms to broaden the post-16 and undergraduate curricula in the UK. He is also a current member of the House of Lords Science and Technology Committee.

== Selected bibliography ==
- Cosmic Coincidences: Dark Matter, Mankind, and Anthropic Cosmology (co-author John Gribbin), 1989, Bantam; ISBN 0-553-34740-3
- New Perspectives in Astrophysical Cosmology, 1995; ISBN 0-521-64544-1
- Gravity's Fatal Attraction: Black Holes in the Universe, 1995; ISBN 0-7167-6029-0, 2nd edition 2009, ISBN 0-521-71793-0
- Before the Beginning – Our Universe and Others, 1997; ISBN 0-7382-0033-6
- Just Six Numbers: The Deep Forces That Shape the Universe, 1999; ISBN 0-297-84297-8 (see Fine-tuned universe § Examples for a list of the six numbers)
- Our Cosmic Habitat, 2001; ISBN 0-691-11477-3
- Our Final Hour: A Scientist's Warning: How Terror, Error, and Environmental Disaster Threaten Humankind's Future In This Century—On Earth and Beyond (UK title: Our Final Century: Will the Human Race Survive the Twenty-first Century?), 2003; ISBN 0-465-06862-6
- What We Still Don't Know ISBN 978-0-7139-9821-4 yet to be published.
- From Here to Infinity: Scientific Horizons, 2011; ISBN 978-1-84668-503-3
- On the Future: Prospects for Humanity, October 2018, Princeton University Press; ISBN 978-0-691-18044-1
- Rees, Martin (September 2020). "Our place in the universe". Scientific American. 323 (3): 56–62. doi:10.1038/scientificamerican0920-58. PMID 39014689. (Online version is titled "How astronomers revolutionized our view of the cosmos".)
- The End of Astronauts (co-author Donald Goldsmith), 2022, Harvard University Press ISBN 978-0-674-25772-6
- If Science is to Save us, 2022, Polity Press ISBN 978-1-5095-5420-1
- Rees, M.,"Cosmology and High Energy Astrophysics: A 50 year Perspective on Personality, Progress, and Prospects", Annual Review of Astronomy and Astrophysics, vol. 60:1–30, 2022.

== Honours and awards ==
He has been president of the Royal Astronomical Society (1992–94) and the British Science Association (1995–96), and was a Member of Council of the Royal Institution of Great Britain until 2010. Rees has received honorary degrees from a number of universities including Bath, Hull, Sussex, Uppsala, Toronto, Durham, Oxford, Cambridge, Harvard, Yale, Melbourne and Sydney. He belongs to several foreign academies, including the US National Academy of Sciences, the Russian Academy of Sciences, the Pontifical Academy of Sciences, the Royal Netherlands Academy of Arts and Sciences, the Science Academy of Turkey and the Japan Academy. He became president of the Royal Society on 1 December 2005 and continued until the end of the Society's 350th Anniversary Celebrations in 2010. In 2011, he was awarded the Templeton Prize. In 2005, Rees was elevated to a life peerage, sitting as a crossbencher in the House of Lords as Baron Rees of Ludlow, of Ludlow in the County of Shropshire. In 2005, he was awarded the Crafoord Prize. Other awards and honours include:

- 1975 – Elected to the American Academy of Arts and Sciences
- 1982 – Elected to the National Academy of Sciences
- 1984 – Heineman Prize
- 1987 – Gold Medal of the Royal Astronomical Society
- 1989 – Balzan Prize for High Energy Astrophysics
- 1992 – Knight Bachelor
- 1993 – Bruce Medal
- 1993 – Elected to the American Philosophical Society
- 1995 – Honorary doctorate from the Faculty of Science and Technology at Uppsala University, Sweden
- 1999 – Golden Plate Award of the American Academy of Achievement
- 2000 – Bruno Rossi Prize
- 2001 – Gruber Prize in Cosmology
- 2003 – Albert Einstein World Award of Science
- 2004 – Henry Norris Russell Lectureship of the American Astronomical Society
- 2004 – Lifeboat Foundation's Guardian Award
- 2004 – Royal Society's Michael Faraday Prize for science communication
- 2005 – Life Peerage
- 2005 – Crafoord Prize, with James Gunn and James Peebles
- 2007 – Order of Merit – in the personal gift of The Queen
- 2007 – Caird Medal of the National Maritime Museum
- 2007 – Honorary Fellow of the Royal Academy of Engineering
- 2011 – Templeton Prize
- 2012 – Institute of Physics Isaac Newton Medal
- 2012 – Manchester Literary and Philosophical Society Dalton Medal
- 2013 – Dirac Medal ICTP
- 2016 – Honorary Doctorate, Harvard University (awarded in Cambridge, Massachusetts, US on 26 May 2016)
- 2017 – Lilienfeld Prize
- 2020 – Fritz Zwicky Prize for Astrophysics and Cosmology
- 2020 – Elected a Legacy Fellow of the American Astronomical Society.
- 2023 – Copley Medal
- 2024 – Wolf Prize in Physics

The Asteroid 4587 Rees and the Sir Martin Rees Academic Scholarship at Shrewsbury International School are named in his honour.

In June 2022, to celebrate his 80th birthday, Rees was the subject of the BBC programme The Sky at Night, in conversation with Professor Chris Lintott.

== Personal life ==
Rees married the anthropologist Caroline Humphrey in 1986. He is an atheist but has criticized militant atheists for being too hostile to religion. Rees is a lifelong supporter of the Labour Party, but has no party affiliation when sitting in the House of Lords.

== See also ==
- Particle chauvinism

Professional and academic associations
Preceded by Robert May	60th President of the Royal Society; 2005–2010	Succeeded by Paul Nurse
Preceded by Ken Pounds	78th President of the Royal Astronomical Society; 1992–1994	Succeeded by Carole Jordan
Academic offices
Preceded by Amartya Sen	37th Master of Trinity College, Cambridge; 2004–2012	Succeeded by Gregory Winter
Orders of precedence in the United Kingdom
Preceded by The Lord Goodlad	Gentlemen; Baron Rees of Ludlow	Followed by The Lord Turner of Ecchinswell
