= Nirupama Raghavan =

Indian astrophysicist and weather scientist

- Education: Indian Institute of Astrophysics
- Scientific career
- Fields: Astrophysics, Astronomy
- Workplaces: Nehru Planetarium (Director)
- Doctoral advisor: Vainu Bappu

Nirupama Raghavan (19 July 1940, Madras – 23 February 2007, Chennai) was an Indian astrophysicist, weather scientist, historian of science and educator. She was the Director of the Nehru Planetarium in New Delhi.

== Life ==
Nirupama was born in Madras on 19 July 1940.

In 1959, she received an undergraduate degree in physics at Women's Christian College, Madras. Her master's degree was from the Presidency College, which she followed up with a doctorate in astronomy with work at the Indian Institute of Technology, Kharagpur and the Kodaikanal Solar Observatory of the Indian Institute of Astrophysics.

She married Raghavan, a metallurgist at Kharagpur, and moved to the United States with him.

Her thesis advisor was Vainu Bappu. Her dissertation (1968) investigated the line asymmetry in sunspots and line profiles of carbon molecules.

She died of cancer in February 2007 in Chennai. To honour her achievements, especially in the outreach to students, a Space Fair was held at the Nehru Planetarium, Delhi, in March 2007.

== Career ==
Nirupama Raghavan was the first woman in the field of observational astronomy in India.

On her family's return to India from the United States in 1982, she joined the Nehru Planetarium in New Delhi.

In 1985, she started the Amateur Astronomers Association in New Delhi. The astrophysicists Priyamvada Natarajan and Sangeeta Malhotra as students were among those who were active in the association and conducted research with her. In the 1990s, she initiated a programme of telescope construction techniques with Chander Devgun for schools in New Delhi.

She taught astrophysics at the Indian Institutes of Technology at Kanpur and Delhi.

Nirupama Raghavan published works in atmospheric science, especially in relation to the spread of pollutants.

Her other major interest was in archaeo-astronomy. Among her contributions here was the identification of Arudra (the red star of the god Shiva) with Betelgeuse, and the coincidence of the festival of Arudra Darsinam at Chidambaram with the ascent of Orion in December. She also showed evidence that the stellar arrangement of Orion provided the template for Chola bronze sculptures of Nataraja. Another observation was on the likely consecration of the Valleswarar Temple in Mylapore, Chennai to have been on 6 June 1761, exactly upon the transit of Venus (Valle being the Tamil name for the planet, to which the temple was dedicated).

== Selected works ==
=== Astrophysics ===
- M. K. V. Bappu; Nirupama Raghavan (1 February 1969). "An Analysis of the Cepheid Variable RT Aurigae". Monthly Notices of the Royal Astronomical Society. 142 (3): 295–316. doi:10.1093/mnras/142.3.295.
- Edgar Everhart; Nirupama Raghavan (1970). "Changes in Total Energy for 392 Long-Period Comets, 1800-1970". Astronomical Journal. 75 (3): 258. Bibcode:1970AJ.....75..258E. doi:10.1086/110974.
- Nirupama Raghavan; George L. Withbroe (1975). "EUV analysis of an active region". Solar Physics. 43 (1): 117–128. Bibcode:1975SoPh...43..117R. doi:10.1007/BF00155149. S2CID 119761624.
- Nirupama Raghavan (1983). "A quantitative study of Ca II network geometry". Solar Physics. 89 (1): 35–42. Bibcode:1983SoPh...89...35R. doi:10.1007/BF00211950. S2CID 119585593.
- Nirupama Raghavan (1997). Celestial Hide and Seek: The Game of Eclipses. National Book Trust.

=== Weather science ===
- Nirupama Raghavan; Pramila Goyal; Swati Basu (1983). "A Gaussian Model for Predicting SO2 Concentration in the City of Agra". Atmospheric Environment. 17 (II).
- Swati Basu; Nirupama Raghavan (1986). "Prediction of inversion strengths and heights from A 1-D nocturnal boundary layer model". Boundary-Layer Meteorology. 35 (1–2): 193–204. Bibcode:1986BoLMe..35..193B. doi:10.1007/BF00117308. S2CID 121693415.
- Nirupama Raghavan; Swati Basu (1988). "Prediction of Wind Speed, Direction and Diffusivity under Neutral Conditions for Tall Stacks". Journal of Applied Meteorology and Climatology. 27 (3).

=== History of science ===
- Nirupama Raghavan (2006). "Is Siva Iconography Inspired by the Stars?" (PDF). Indian Journal of History of Science. 41 (3).
