= Non-planetary abiogenesis =

Hypothetical non-planetary origins of life

There are several hypotheses of the possibility of life originating in the universe in places other than planets, dated as early as 1774. Suggested locations are within stars, on the surface of stars, as well as in the interstellar space.

== Life within the Sun ==
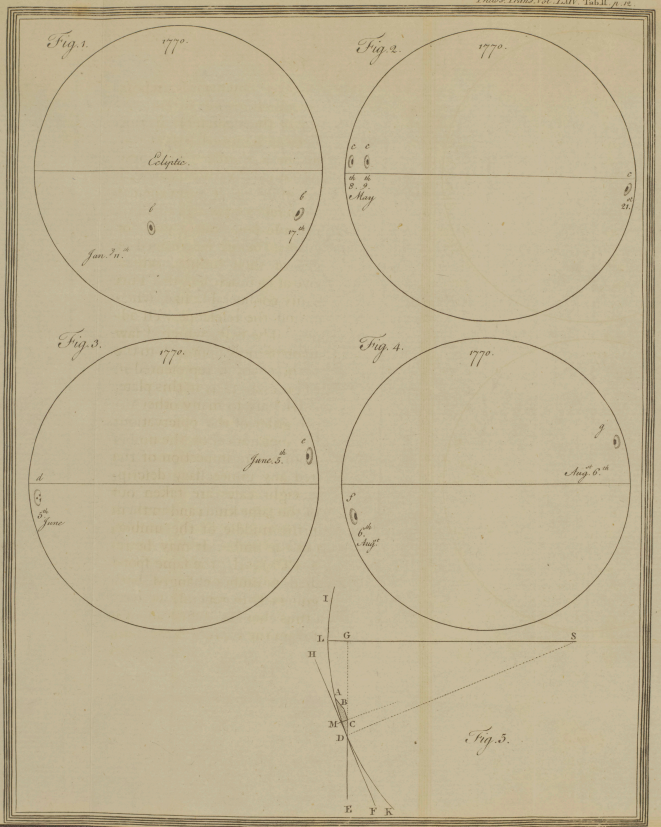
A.Wilson's drawings of sunspots (Note: "All the foregoing appearances, when taken together, and when duly considered, seem to prove in the most convincing manner, that the nucleus of this spot was considerably beneath the level of the sun's spherical surface")

The extreme temperatures and radiation of the Sun do not allow biological life to exist in it.

In 1965 astronomer Ernst Julius Öpik wrote the article "Is the Sun Habitable?", in which he described how in 1774 Alexander Wilson of Glasgow, remarking that sunspots are apparently lower than the rest of the surface of the Sun, hypothesized that the interior of the Sun is colder than its surface and possibly suitable for life. Wilson suggested that the sunspots he observed were probably "immense excavations in the body of the Sun" (p. 16) considerably beneath the surface of the Sun and they provided a glimpse on the surface below that does not emit much light. Prefacing with many words of caution, he further hypothesized that the Sun "is made up of two kinds of matter, very different in their qualities; that by far the greater part is solid and dark" (p. 20) and the dark globe is thinly covered in a luminous substance. His hypothesis, acknowledged by William Herschel, did not contradict the knowledge of the time. In the 20th century, amateur astronomer G. Buere of Osnabruck offered a prize of DM 25,000 to anyone who can disprove the statement that the Sun has life. When objecting to a claimant of the prize, G. Buere essentially repeated the Wilson-Herschel hypothesis: "The sunspots are not spots but holes. They are dark which means that the interior of the Sun is cooler than its exterior. If this is so, there must be vegetation and the solar core is habitable."

== Life within other stars ==
In order to discuss abiological life inside stars, Luis Anchordoqui and Eugene Chudnovsky suggest three postulates which must be satisfied by any reasonable definition of life:

- The ability to encode information
- The ability of information carriers to self-replicate faster than they disintegrate
- The presence of free energy needed to constantly create order out of the disorder (i.e., to combat entropy) via self-replication

The authors proceed to argue that inside Sun-like stars objects that satisfy the above conditions can exist. Their proposal involves cosmic strings and monopoles that encode unstable nuclear states. They also suggest that an indication on the existence of such "nuclear life" could be observed deviations from predictions of models of stellar evolution, such as anomalies in luminosity. The authors themselves characterize the attributions of such anomalies to "life" as "a very long shot".

== Life elsewhere ==
The concept of life forms living on the surface of neutron stars was proposed by radio astronomer Frank Drake in 1973. Drake said that the atomic nuclei in neutron stars have large variety which might combine in supernuclei, analogous to the molecules that serve the base of life on Earth. Life of this type would be extremely fast, with several generations arising and dying within the span of a second. With a tongue in cheek, Drake described musings of a (hypothetical) scientist on a neutron star:

"Our theoreticians have predicted things called atoms ... almost empty space ... we never thought they could exist but they seem to exist out there. Could there be life? Suppose those things bond together to make a big molecule? Well it wouldn't be alive. After all, the temperature is too low and everything happens so slowly that nothing ever changes."

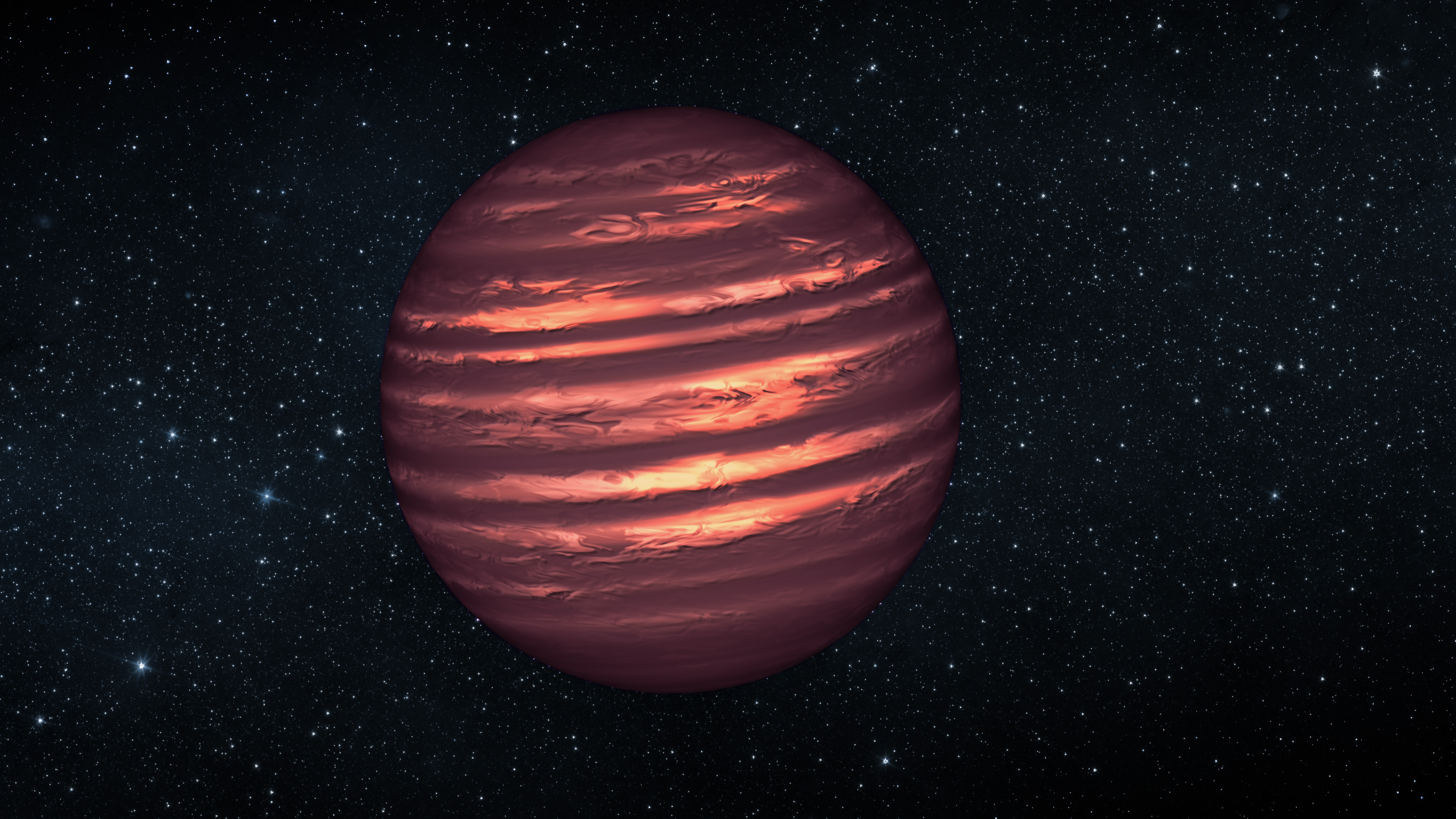
Artistic expression of the atmosphere of a brown dwarf

In chapter "Stellar Graveyards, Nucleosynthesis, and Why We Exist" of The Stars of Heaven (2001) Clifford A. Pickover discusses various forms of abiological life. He poses the question whether in the times of ultimate expansion of the Universe with extremely low density of matter some structures could exist that can support the life of the entities he calls the "Diffuse Ones". He also discussed the possibility of life without sunlight/starlight, e.g., on the surface of brown dwarfs. In the latter discussion he extrapolates from the existence of life with no sunlight in the depths of Earth's ocean that draw energy from hydrogen sulfide. Yates et al. also discussed life in the atmospheres of brown dwarfs in 2017, and in 2019 Manasvi Lingam and Abraham Loeb extended the discussion of Yates et al. Both articles extend the viability of Earth-like biological life beyond planets. Their ideas were criticized by experts in brown dwarfs.

In 2007 Russian expert in plasma physics Vadim Tsytovich together with German and Australian colleagues published a paper in which they speculated about plasma-based inorganic living matter, extrapolating from computer simulations of self-organization reported in plasma. The simulated conditions can exist in nebulae. Tsytovich claims that the described structures are autonomous, reproducing and evolving, thus satisfying the conditions expected from life.

== In fiction ==
Some works of science fiction involve life on or in neutron stars, whole sentient stars and even sentient black holes.

== See also ==
- Carbon chauvinism
- Hypothetical types of biochemistry
- Planetary chauvinism
- Panspermia
