= Priyamvada Natarajan =

Indian astronomer

Priya Natarajan
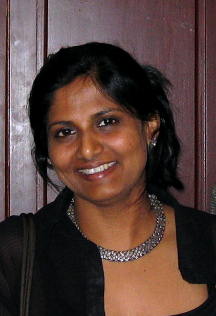
- Natarajan at KITP, Santa Barbara
- Born: Coimbatore, Tamil Nadu, India
- Education: MIT, University of Cambridge, Trinity College, Institute of Astronomy
- Scientific career
- Fields: Cosmology, theoretical astrophysics
- Workplaces: Yale University (professor)

Priyamvada "Priya" Natarajan is a theoretical astrophysicist, Chair of the department of astronomy and professor of physics at Yale University. She is noted for her work in mapping dark matter and dark energy, particularly in gravitational lensing and in models describing the assembly and accretion histories of supermassive black holes. She authored the book Mapping the Heavens: The Radical Scientific Ideas That Reveal the Cosmos. She has been featured on shows such as Black Hole Apocalypse on PBS, showcasing her work and background.

== Early life ==
Priya Natarajan was born in Coimbatore, Tamil Nadu in India to academic parents. She grew up in New Delhi, where she would visit Nehru Planetarium Delhi and had a great interest in celestial and terrestrial maps as a kid. Her parents bought her a telescope and microscope as a child, to which she commented: "it was very clear to me that it was the telescope." During her high school education, her father gifted her a computer, Commodore 64 (personal computers were not known in India at the time), for mapping the night sky, which inspired her later education, career and writing a book Mapping the Heavens: The Radical Scientific Ideas That Reveal the Cosmos, published in 2016.

In 1984, Natarajan enrolled herself in an amateur astronomy club based at the Nehru Planetarium in New Delhi. She told the then-director of the planetarium Nirupama Raghavan that she owned a personal computer and asked for a research project. Raghavan immediately assigned her to plot the whole night sky over New Delhi. Within six weeks Natarajan self-taught spherical geometry and developed the technique to map the night sky. Two years later, she completed the project, to which Raghavan commented that she had become a "real scientist." She studied at St. Thomas's School before completing her schooling at Delhi Public School.

== Education ==
Natarajan has undergraduate degrees in physics and mathematics from M.I.T (1986-1991). She was awarded a Master of Science from the Program in Science, Technology & Society at the Massachusetts Institute of Technology, Cambridge, MA (1991-1994). She continued for a Ph.D. programme and started researching on the history and philosophy of science focussing on cosmology. After three years she met German astronomer Martin Schwarzschild who understood her capacity in astronomy and persuaded her to change her study to theoretical astrophysics. She later recalled: "I never really went back to finish that first PhD!"

With the Isaac Newton Fellowship from the University of Cambridge, Natarajan moved to England for a fresh doctoral course to work with Martin Rees at the Institute of Astronomy, on supermassive black holes. She received a Ph.D. degree in 1998. There she was a member of Trinity College and was elected to a Title A Research Fellowship that she held from 1997 to 2003. She was the first woman astrophysicist elected as a Fellow at Trinity College. Prior to going to Yale, she was a visiting postdoctoral fellow at the Canadian Institute for Theoretical Astrophysics in Toronto, Canada.

== Career ==
Natarajan joined the faculty of Yale University in 2000 and later promoted to professor of astronomy and physics. She had served as Chair of the National Astronomy and Astrophysics Advisory Committee that advises NASA, NSF and DoE; as Chair of the Division of Astrophysics of the American Physical Society. As of 2024, she was a Joseph S. and Sophia S. Fruton Professor and Chair of Astronomy. As of 2025, she is director of the Franke Program in Science and the Humanities.

Natarajan held a Whitney Humanities Fellowship at Yale (2006–2007) and was the Emeline Conland Bigelow Fellow at the Radcliffe Institute for Advanced Study at Harvard (2008–2009). She was awarded a Guggenheim Fellowship in 2009.

== Research ==
Natarajan's research spans two main areas: mapping dark matter using gravitational lensing, and the formation and growth of supermassive black holes across cosmic time.

=== Dark matter mapping ===
Natarajan developed a method for mapping the distribution of dark matter on small scales within galaxy clusters using gravitational lensing. Her technique combines strong and weak lensing to reconstruct the substructure of cluster-lenses at high resolution, and has become a standard tool in observational cosmology. Working with data from the Hubble Space Telescope's Frontier Fields program, her group has used clusters of galaxies as natural telescopes to study magnified background sources and to test predictions of the standard cosmological model on small scales.

=== Black hole seeds and growth ===
Natarajan proposed, with Martin Rees, a model for the formation of massive direct-collapse black hole seeds at high redshift — black holes that form not from stellar remnants but from the direct gravitational collapse of primordial gas in early dark matter halos. This model addresses the problem of how supermassive black holes observed at very high redshift could have grown so massive so quickly.

In 2023, Natarajan and collaborators reported the detection of UHZ1, an X-ray-luminous source at redshift z ≈ 10.1 identified using the James Webb Space Telescope and Chandra X-ray Observatory, consistent with an actively accreting black hole with properties matching the direct-collapse seed model.

=== Self-regulation of black hole growth ===
Natarajan proposed that AGN feedback imposes an upper mass limit — a "ceiling" — on black hole growth, predicting that the most massive black holes self-regulate through the energy they inject into their surroundings. This prediction, made around 2008, was subsequently confirmed by observational surveys of black hole demographics.

Her other research interests include the co-evolution of galaxies and their central black holes, multi-messenger astrophysics of supermassive black hole binaries, the application of machine learning to astrophysical datasets., and Gamma-ray bursts – the relation of gamma-ray burst rates to the globally averaged star formation rate, the morphology and properties of gamma-ray burst host galaxies in the optical, and sub-mm wave-bands, the SN-GRB connection.

== Honors and awards ==
- Fellow, Royal Astronomical Society, 2008
- Emeline Conland Bigelow Fellowship, Radcliffe Institute for Advanced Study, Harvard, 2008–2009
- Guggenheim Fellowship, 2009
- Award for Academic Achievement, Global Organization for the People of Indian Origin (GOPIO), 2009
- "Face of the Future" Award, India Abroad Foundation, 2010
- JILA Fellowship, Joint Institute for Laboratory Astrophysics, University of Colorado Boulder, 2010
- Fellow, Explorers Club, 2010
- Fellow, American Physical Society, 2011
- India Empire NRI Award for Achievement in the Sciences, 2011
- Caroline Herschel Distinguished Visitor, Space Telescope Science Institute, 2011–2012
- Sophie and Tycho Brahe Professorship, Dark Cosmology Center, Niels Bohr Institute, University of Copenhagen
- Honorary Professor for Life, University of Delhi
- "Genius Award", Liberty Science Center, 2022
- Fellow, American Association for the Advancement of Science, 2023
- Fellow, American Academy of Arts and Sciences, 2023
- Fellow, American Astronomical Society, 2024
- Time 100 Most Influential People, 2024
- Dannie Heineman Prize for Astrophysics, 2025
- "Great Immigrants" honoree, Carnegie Corporation of New York, 2025
