= Carbon chauvinism =

Neologism questioning importance of carbon for life

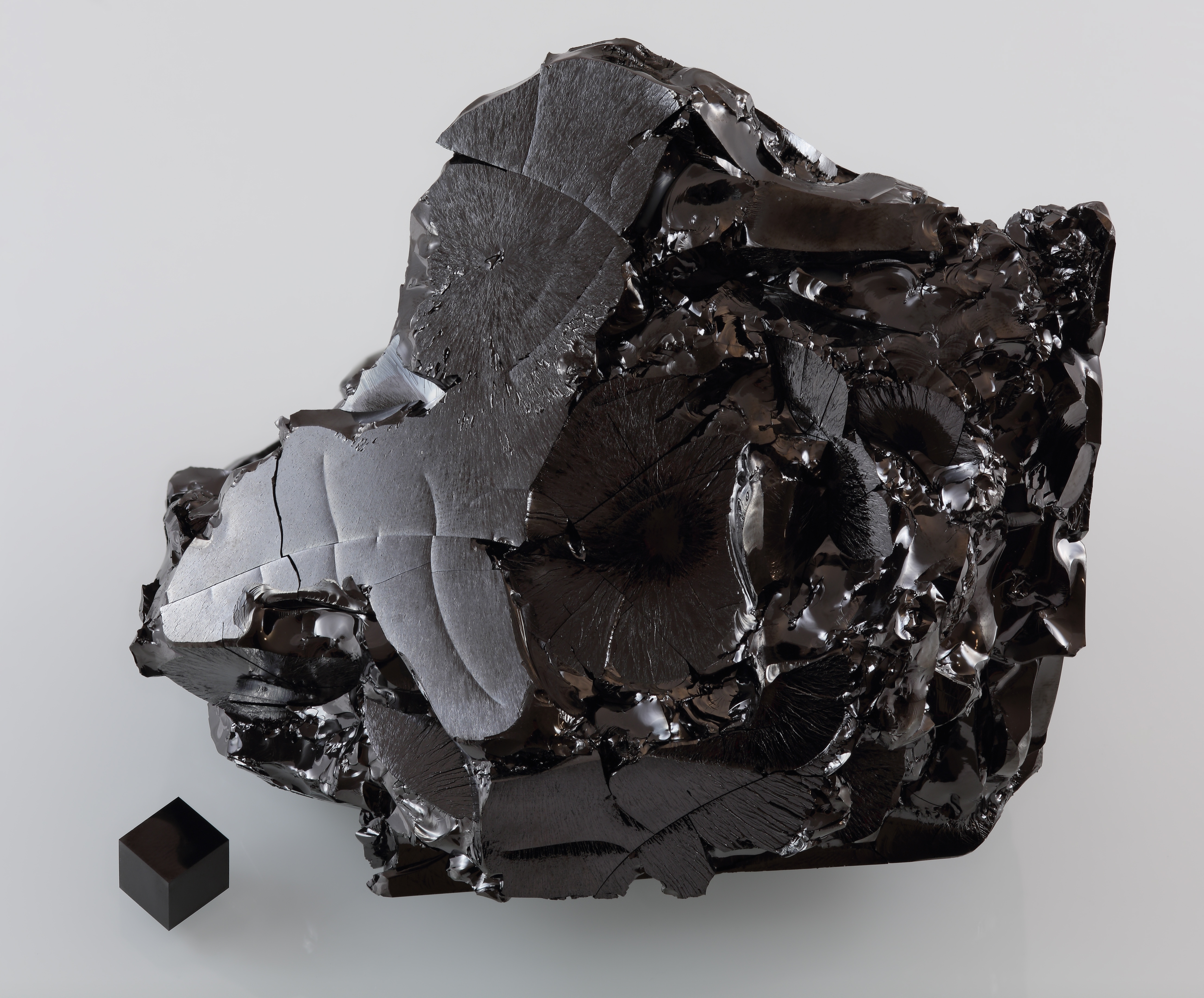
A large sample of glassy carbon, and a nearby 1 cm^{3} graphite cube

Carbon chauvinism is a neologism meant to disparage the assumption that the chemical processes of hypothetical extraterrestrial life must be constructed primarily from carbon (organic compounds) because as far as is known, carbon's chemical and thermodynamic properties render it far superior to all other elements at forming molecules used in living organisms.

The expression "carbon chauvinism" is also used to criticize the idea that artificial intelligence cannot in theory be sentient or truly intelligent because the underlying matter is not biological. Furthermore, the term is used by transhumanists to object to the commonly held view that life has an inherently higher moral value than hypothetical artificial consciousness.

== Concept ==
The term was used as early as 1973, when scientist Carl Sagan described it and other human chauvinisms that limit imagination of possible extraterrestrial life. It suggests that human beings, as carbon-based life forms who have never encountered any life that has evolved outside the Earth's environment, may find it difficult to envision radically different biochemistries.

== Carbon alternatives ==
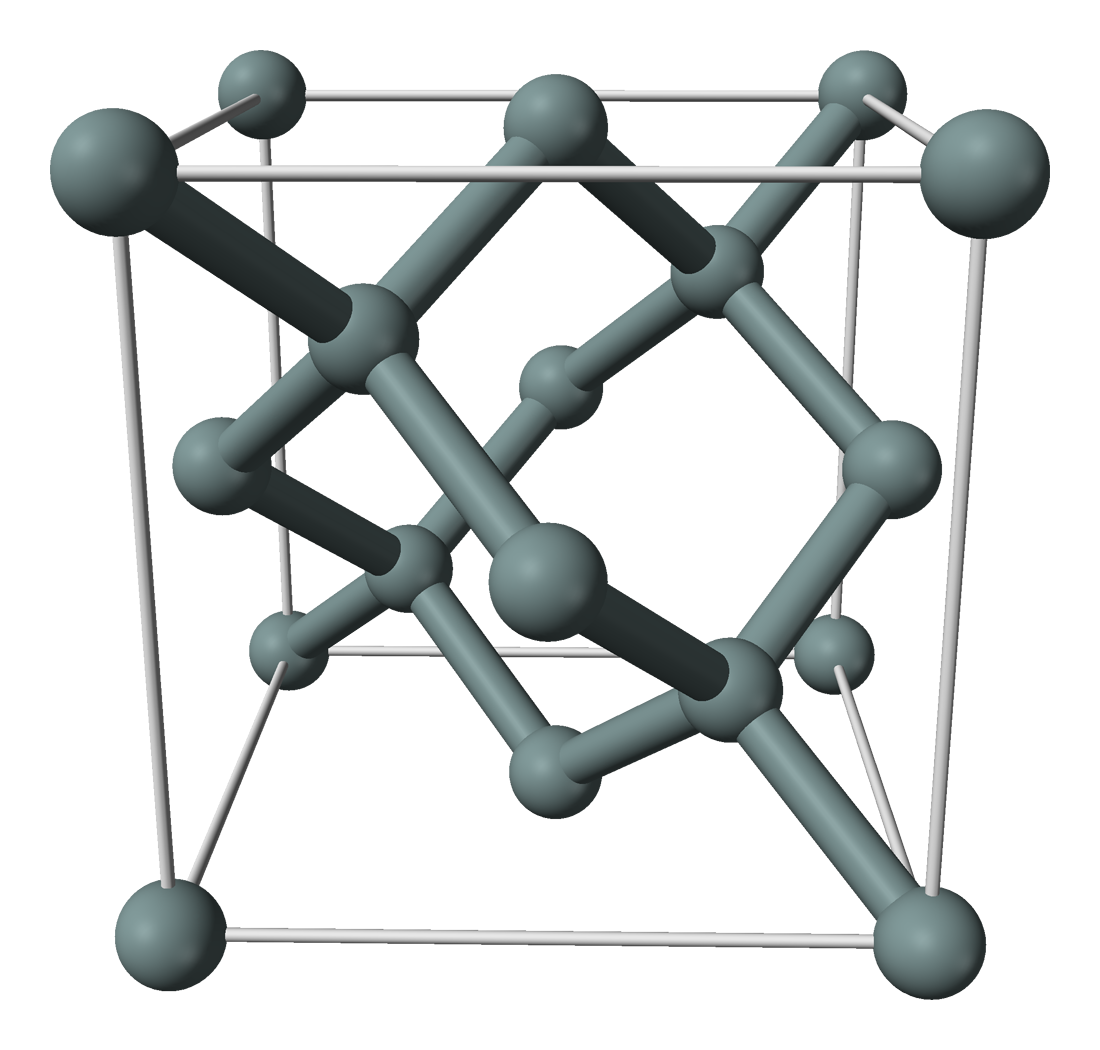
Silicon in a diamond cubic crystal structure

Like carbon, silicon can form four stable bonds with itself and other elements, and long chemical chains known as silane polymers, which are very similar to the hydrocarbons essential to life on Earth. Silicon is more reactive than carbon, which could make it optimal for extremely cold environments. However, silanes spontaneously burn in the presence of oxygen at relatively low temperatures, so an oxygen atmosphere may be deadly to silicon-based life. On the other hand, it is worth considering that alkanes are as a rule quite flammable, but carbon-based life on Earth does not store energy directly as alkanes, but as sugars, lipids, alcohols, and other hydrocarbon compounds with very different properties. Water as a solvent would also react with silanes, but again, this only matters if for some reason silanes are used or mass-produced by such organisms.

Silicon lacks an important property of carbon: single, double, and triple carbon-carbon bonds are all relatively stable. Aromatic carbon structures underpin DNA, which could not exist without this property of carbon. By comparison, compounds containing silene double bonds (such as silabenzene, an unstable analogue of benzene) exhibit far lower stability than the equivalent carbon compound. A pair of silane single bonds have significantly greater total enthalpy than a single silene double bond, so simple disilenes readily autopolymerise, and silicon favors the formation of linear chains of single bonds (see the double bond rule).

Hydrocarbons and organic compounds are abundant in meteorites, comets, and interstellar clouds, while their silicon analogs have never been observed in nature. Silicon does, however, form complex one-, two- and three-dimensional polymers in which oxygen atoms form bridges between silicon atoms. These are termed silicates. They are both stable and abundant under terrestrial conditions, and have been proposed as a basis for a pre-organic form of evolution on Earth (see clay hypothesis).

== See also ==
- Abiogenesis
- Anthropocentrism
- Carbon-based life
- Hypothetical types of biochemistry
- Life origination beyond planets
- Particle chauvinism
- Planetary chauvinism
- Shadow biosphere
- Type physicalism
