= 4587 Rees =

Mars-crossing asteroid

Discovery
- Discovered by: C. J. van Houten; I. van Houten-G. T. Gehrels
- Discovery site: Palomar Obs.
- Discovery date: 30 September 1973

Designations
- Named after: Martin Rees (British cosmologist)
- Alternative designations: 3239 T-2 · 1990 HQ; 6378 P-L
- Minor planet category: Mars-crosser formerly Amor (Note: Archived JPL-data of 4587 Rees from January 2010 and September 2012)

Orbital characteristics
- Epoch 27 April 2019 (JD 2458600.5)
- Uncertainty parameter 0
- Observation arc: 57.10 yr (20,855 d)
- Aphelion: 4.0117 AU
- Perihelion: 1.3057 AU
- Semi-major axis: 2.6587 AU
- Eccentricity: 0.5089
- Orbital period (sidereal): 4.34 yr (1,583 d)
- Mean anomaly: 232.48°
- Mean motion: 0° 13^{m} 38.64^{s} / day
- Inclination: 24.626°
- Longitude of ascending node: 180.37°
- Argument of perihelion: 83.989°
- Earth MOID: 0.5364 AU (209 LD)
- T_{Jupiter}: 3.0760

Physical characteristics
- Mean diameter: 2.03 km (calculated)
- Synodic rotation period: 7.879±0.002 h (Note: Lightcurve plot of (4587) Rees from May 2016 by Robert Stephens at the Center for Solar System Studies (U81). Period of 7.879±0.01 hour with an amplitude of 0.55 magnitude. Quality code is 3 (lightcurve rating at CS3). Summary figures at the LCDB and CS3.)
- Geometric albedo: 0.20 (assumed)
- Spectral type: S/Sr (assumed)
- Absolute magnitude (H): 15.3; 15.87

4587 Rees, provisional designation 3239 T-2, is a Mars-crosser and former near-Earth object on an eccentric orbit from the asteroid belt, approximately 2 kilometers (1.2 miles) in diameter. It was discovered during the second Palomar–Leiden Trojan survey on 30 September 1973, by Dutch astronomer couple Ingrid and Cornelis van Houten at Leiden, and Tom Gehrels at the Palomar Observatory in California. The assumed S-type asteroid has a rotation period of 7.9 hours and is likely elongated in shape. It was named after British astrophysicist Martin Rees.

== Orbit and classification ==
Rees is a Mars-crossing asteroid, a dynamically unstable group between the main belt and the near-Earth populations, crossing the orbit of Mars at 1.66 AU. It orbits the Sun at a distance of 1.31–4.01 AU once every 4 years and 4 months (1,583 days; semi-major axis of 2.66 AU). Its orbit has a high eccentricity of 0.51 and an inclination of 25° with respect to the ecliptic. The body's observation arc begins with its first observation as 6378 P-L at Palomar in September 1960, or 13 years prior to its official discovery observation.

=== Former near-Earth object ===
Before 2014, Rees has been a near-Earth object of the Amor group, as its perihelion was slightly less than 1.3 AU due to the body's osculating orbit.

=== Close approaches ===
In July 2072, Rees will pass 20,686,000 km (0.13828 AU) from Mars, the closest since it passed 15,810,000 km (0.1057 AU) from the Red Planet on 28 January 1843. The asteroid will also pass 7,110,000 km (0.0475 AU) from the second largest asteroid, 4 Vesta, on 30 January 2121.

=== Palomar–Leiden Trojan survey ===
The survey designation "T-2" stands for the second Palomar–Leiden Trojan survey, named after the fruitful collaboration of the Palomar and Leiden Observatory in the 1960s and 1970s. Gehrels used Palomar's Samuel Oschin telescope (also known as the 48-inch Schmidt Telescope), and shipped the photographic plates to Ingrid and Cornelis van Houten at Leiden Observatory where astrometry was carried out. The trio are credited with the discovery of several thousand asteroid discoveries.

== Naming ==
This minor planet was named after Martin Rees (born 1942), a much awarded English cosmologist and astrophysicist who has studied the galactic evolution. Rees became Astronomer Royal and President of the Royal Society in 1995 and 2005, respectively. He is also the director of the Institute of Astronomy and a professor of astronomy at the University of Cambridge. The asteroid's name was proposed by Jan Oort, and the official citation was published by the Minor Planet Center on 28 April 1991 (M.P.C. 18143).

== In fiction ==
Asteroid 4587 is mentioned in Arthur C. Clarke's 1975 (so not then yet named Rees) novel Imperial Earth as the site of a black hole factory where the singularity used in the Asymptotic Drive to power the spaceship Sirius featured in the book is manufactured.

== Physical characteristics ==
Rees is an assumed, stony S-type asteroid. Other sources published by EARN assume an Sr-subtype that transitions from the S-type to the rare R-type asteroids.

=== Rotation period ===
In May 2016, a rotational lightcurve of Rees was obtained from photometric observations by Robert Stephens at the Center for Solar System Studies in California. Lightcurve analysis gave a well-defined rotation period of 7.879±0.002 hours with a brightness variation of 0.55 magnitude (U=3), indicative of an elongated, non-spheroidal shape. The result confirms previous observations by Czech astronomer Petr Pravec (7.7886 h) and by astronomers at the Palomar Transient Factory (7.790 h) from April 2003 and October 2012, respectively (U=3/2). (Note: Lightcurve observation in April 2003 by Petr Pravec: rotation period 7.7886±0.0027 hours with a brightness amplitude of 0.78 mag. Quality code is 3. Summary figures for (4587) Rees at the LCDB and data sheet from the Ondrejov Asteroid Photometry Project.)

=== Diameter and albedo ===
The Collaborative Asteroid Lightcurve Link assumes a standard albedo for an S-type asteroid of 0.20 and calculates a diameter of 2.03 kilometers based on an absolute magnitude of 15.87.
