= Carbon-based life =

The Lewis structure of a carbon atom, showing its four valence electrons

Carbon-based life is the concept that carbon is the core element for all known forms of life, and a core component of all complex biological molecules with carbon representing approximately 45–50% of all dry biomass. Complex biological molecules consist of carbon atoms bonded with other elements, in particular oxygen and hydrogen but frequently also nitrogen, phosphorus, and sulfur (collectively known as CHNOPS). In these molecules carbon's four valence electrons and subsequent propensity to form four bonds lends to its function as the "skeleton" of organic molecules. In addition to molecular level properties of carbon, life on Earth also relies on large scale processes known as the carbon cycle, involving geological and atmospheric processes.

While it is widely believed that any life found elsewhere in the universe will most likely also be carbon-based, silicon and boron have been discussed as alternatives because of their abilities to form 4 or 5 bonds respectively. These possibilities have resulted in science-fiction literature stories that include life based on silicon or boron or other alternative elements.

== Characteristics of carbon important for life ==
Carbon's widespread abundance, its ability to form stable bonds with numerous other elements, and its unusual ability to form polymers at the temperatures commonly encountered on Earth enables it to serve as a common element of all known living organisms. In a 2018 study, carbon was found to compose approximately 550 billion tons of all life on Earth. Approximately 50% of the Earth's biomass as dry weight (i.e. without water) is carbon. The carbon content of different kinds of biomass varies from 42%-71%.

The most important characteristics of carbon as a basis for the chemistry of cellular life are that each carbon atom is capable of forming up to four valence bonds with other atoms simultaneously, and that the energy required to make or break a bond with a carbon atom is at an appropriate level for building large and complex molecules which may be both stable and reactive. Carbon atoms bond readily to other carbon atoms; this allows the building of arbitrarily long macromolecules and polymers in a process known as catenation. "What we normally think of as 'life' is based on chains of carbon atoms, with a few other atoms, such as nitrogen or phosphorus", per Stephen Hawking in a 2008 lecture, "carbon [...] has the richest chemistry."

Because it is lightweight and relatively small in size, carbon molecules are easy for enzymes to manipulate. Carbonic anhydrase is a key enzyme for all carbon-based life.

== Key molecules ==
The most notable classes of biological macromolecules used in the fundamental processes of living organisms include:

- Proteins, which are the building blocks from which the structures of living organisms are constructed (this includes almost all enzymes, which catalyse organic chemical reactions).
- Amino acid, make up proteins, included the use in genetic code of life.
- Nucleic acids, which carry genetic information.
- Ribonucleic acid (RNA), production of proteins.
- Deoxyribonucleic acid (DNA), nucleic acid in genetic form.
- Peptide, building block of proteins.
- Lipids, which also store energy, but in a more concentrated form, and which may be stored for extended periods in the bodies of animals.
- Phospholipid used in cell membrane.
- Carbohydrates, which store energy in a form that can be used by living cells.
- Lectin, for binding proteins.
- Monosaccharide, simple sugars, including glucose and fructose.
- Disaccharides, sugar soluble in water, including lactose, maltose, and sucrose.
- Starch, made of amylose and amylopectin, plants energy storage.
- Glycogen, energy in animals.
- Cellulose, a biopolymer, found in the cell walls of plants.
- Fatty acid, two types, saturated fat and unsaturated fat (oil), are stored energy.
- Essential fatty acid, needed but not synthesized by the human body.
- Steroid, hormone, and used in cell membrane.
- Neurotransmitter, are signaling molecules.
- Cholesterol, used in the brain and spinal cord of animals.
- Wax, found in beeswax and lanolin. Plant wax used for protection.

== Water ==
Schematic of photosynthesis in plants. The carbohydrates produced are stored in or used by the plant. Photosynthesis is foundation of food on Earth

Liquid water is essential for carbon-based life. Chemical bonding of carbon molecules requires liquid water. Water has the chemical property to make compound-solvent pairing. Water provides the reversible hydration of carbon dioxide. Hydration of carbon dioxide is needed in carbon-based life. All life on Earth uses the same biochemistry of carbon. Water is important in life's carbonic anhydrase the interaction of between carbon dioxide and water. Carbonic anhydrase needs a family of carbon base enzymes for the hydration of carbon dioxide and acid–base homeostasis, that regulates PH levels in life. In plant life, liquid water is needed for photosynthesis, the biological process plants use to convert light energy and carbon dioxide into chemical energy. Water makes up 55% to 60% of the human body by weight.

== Relation to biogeochemical cycles ==
The carbon cycle is a biogeochemical cycle that is important in maintaining life on Earth over a long time span. The cycle includes carbon sequestration and carbon sinks. Plate tectonics are needed for life over a long time span, and carbon-based life is important in the plate tectonics process. Iron- and sulfur-based Anoxygenic photosynthesis life forms that lived from 3.80 to 3.85 billion years ago on Earth produced an abundance of black shale deposits. These shale deposits increase heat flow and crust buoyancy, especially on the sea floor, helping to increase plate tectonics. Talc is another organic mineral that helps drive plate tectonics. Inorganic processes also help drive plate tectonics. Carbon-based photosynthesis life caused a rise in oxygen on Earth. This increase of oxygen helped plate tectonics form the first continents.

== Other candidates ==
It is frequently assumed in astrobiology that if life exists elsewhere in the Universe, it will also be carbon-based. Critics, like Carl Sagan in 1973, refer to this assumption as carbon chauvinism. A few other elements have been proposed as candidates for supporting biological systems and processes as fundamentally as carbon does, for example, processes such as metabolism. The most frequently suggested alternative is silicon. Silicon, atomic number of 14, more than twice the size of carbon, shares a group in the periodic table with carbon, can also form four valence bonds, and also bonds to itself readily, though generally in the form of crystal lattices rather than long chains. Despite these similarities, silicon is considerably more electropositive than carbon, and silicon compounds do not readily recombine into different permutations in a manner that would plausibly support lifelike processes. Silicon is abundant on Earth, but as it is more electropositive and in a water based environment it forms Si–O bonds rather than Si–Si bonds. Boron does not react with acids and does not form chains naturally. Thus boron is not a candidate for life. Arsenic is toxic to life, and its possible candidacy has been rejected. In the past (1960s–1970s) other candidates for life were plausible, but with time and more research, only carbon has the complexity and stability to make large molecules and polymers essential for life.

== Fiction ==
Speculations about the chemical structure and properties of hypothetical non-carbon-based life have been a recurring theme in science fiction. Silicon is often used as a substitute for carbon in fictional lifeforms because of its chemical similarities. In cinematic and literary science fiction, when man-made machines cross from non-living to living, this new form is often presented as an example of non-carbon-based life. Since the advent of the microprocessor in the late 1960s, such machines are often classed as "silicon-based life". Other examples of fictional "silicon-based life" can be seen in the 1967 episode "The Devil in the Dark" from Star Trek: The Original Series, in which a living rock creature's biochemistry is based on silicon. In the 1994 The X-Files episode "Firewalker", in which a silicon-based organism is discovered in a volcano.

In the 1984 film adaptation of Arthur C. Clarke's 1982 novel 2010: Odyssey Two, a character argues, "Whether we are based on carbon or on silicon makes no fundamental difference; we should each be treated with appropriate respect."

In JoJolion, the eighth part of the larger JoJo's Bizarre Adventure series, a mysterious race of silicon-based lifeforms "Rock Humans" serve as the primary antagonists.

== Gallery ==
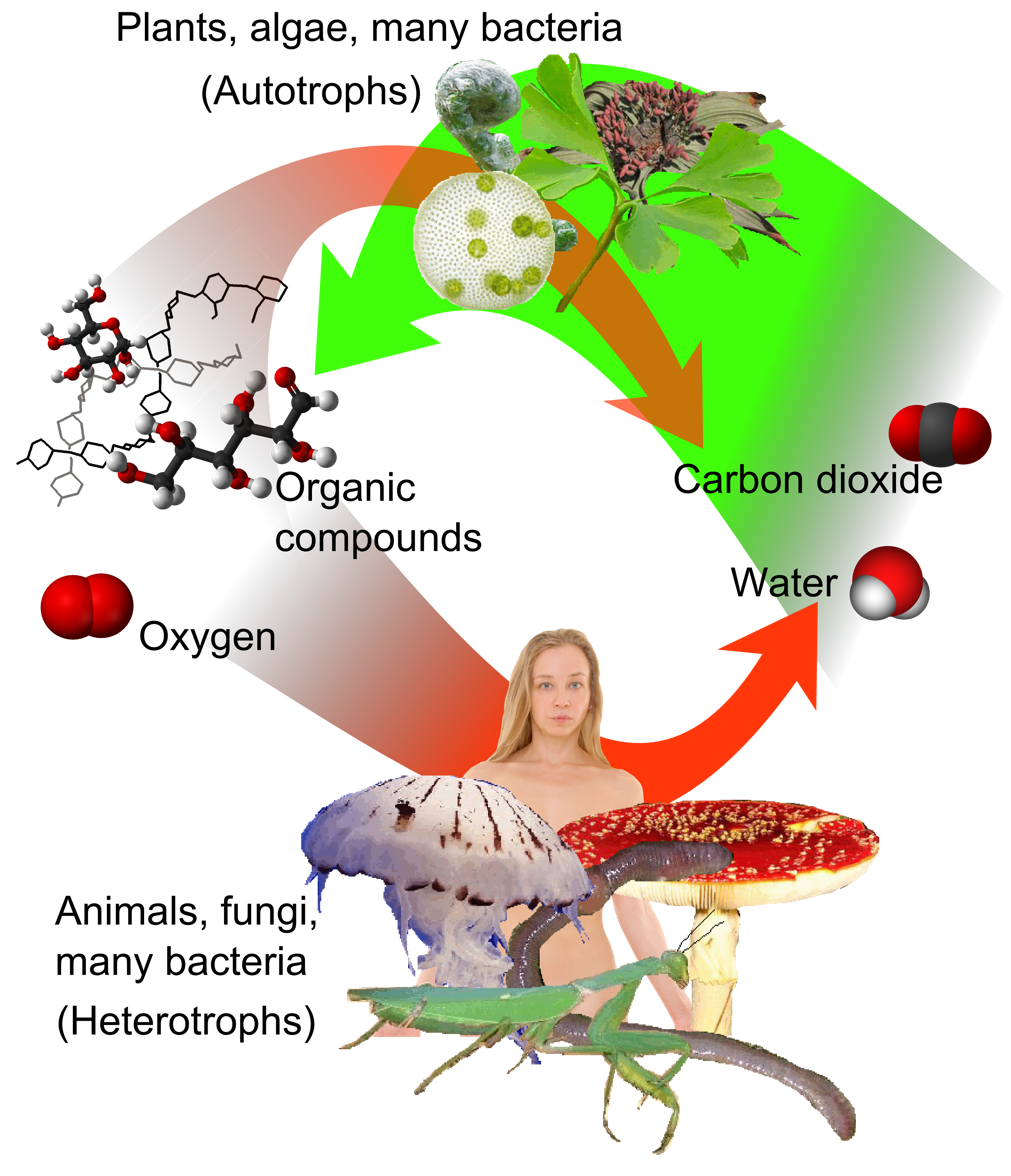
Correlation between the carbon cycle and formation of organic compounds.

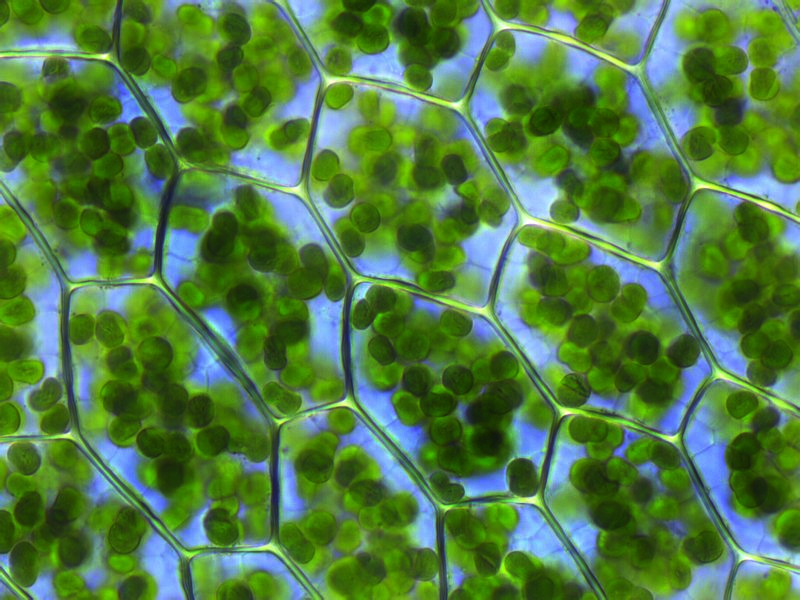
Plant cell wall (cellulose) and chloroplasts conduct photosynthesis in plant cells and other eukaryotic organisms.

The arrangement of cellulose and other polysaccharides in a plant cell wall

Cell types: eukaryotic cell (left) and prokaryotic cell (right)

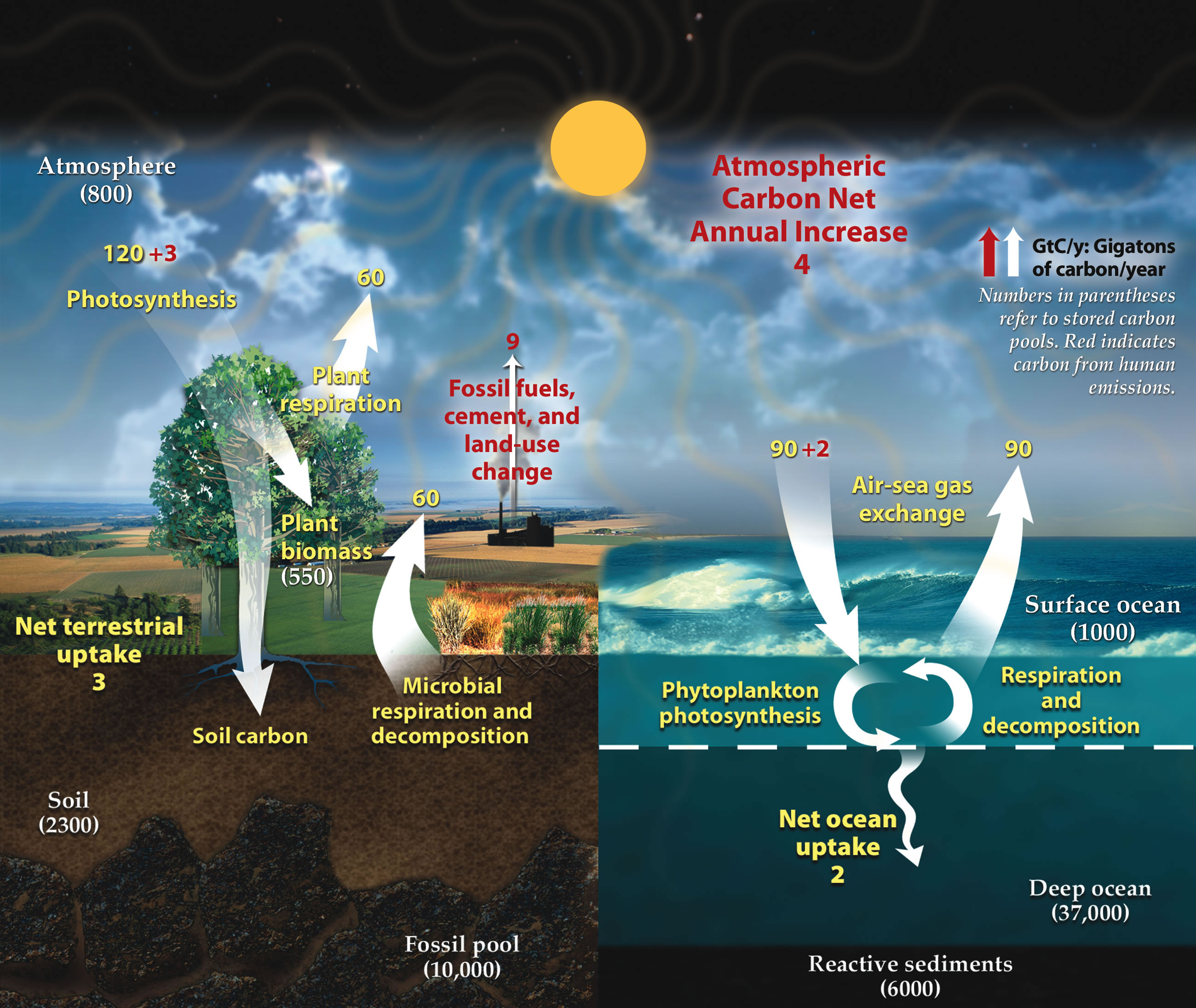
Fast carbon cycle showing the movement of carbon between land, atmosphere

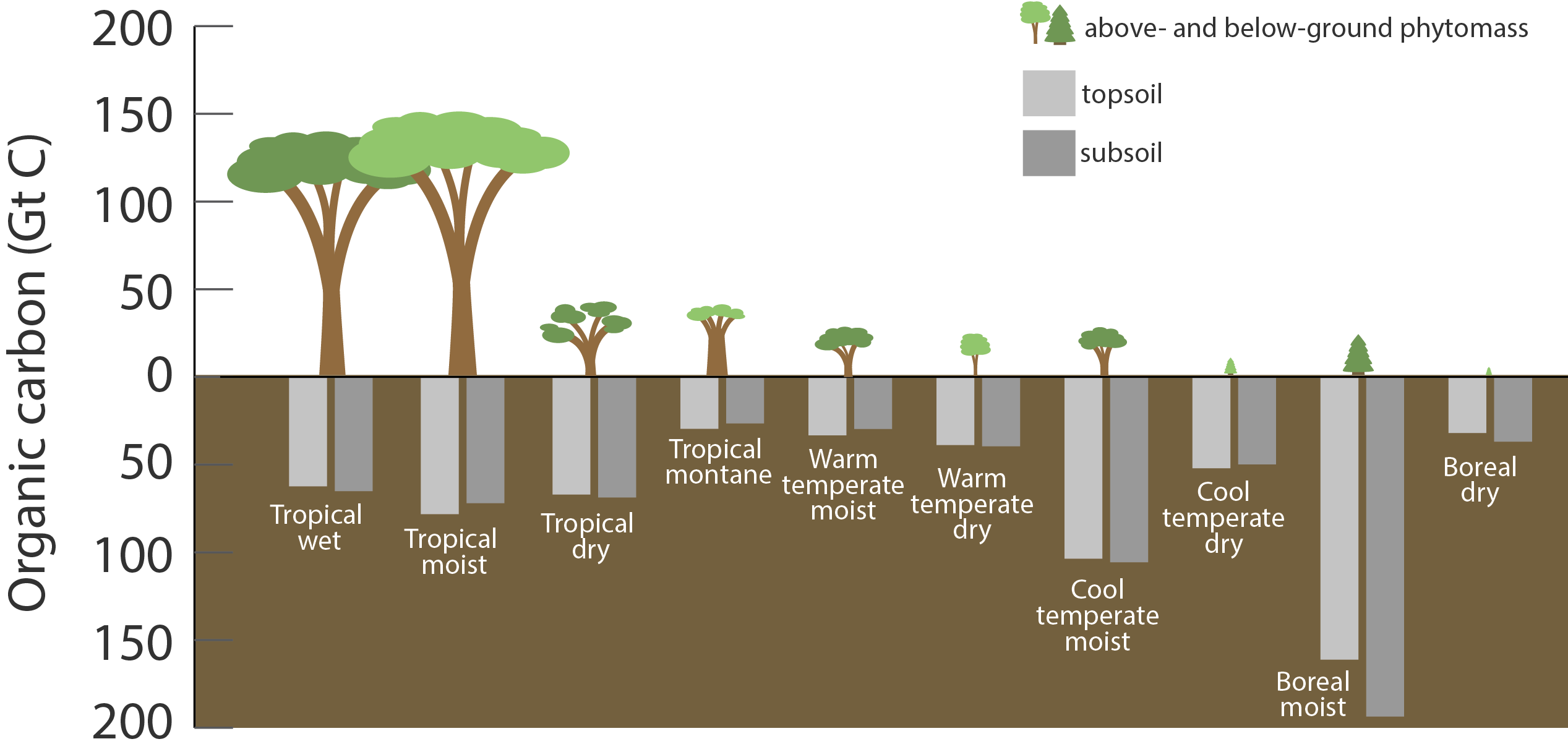
Carbon stored in ecosystems

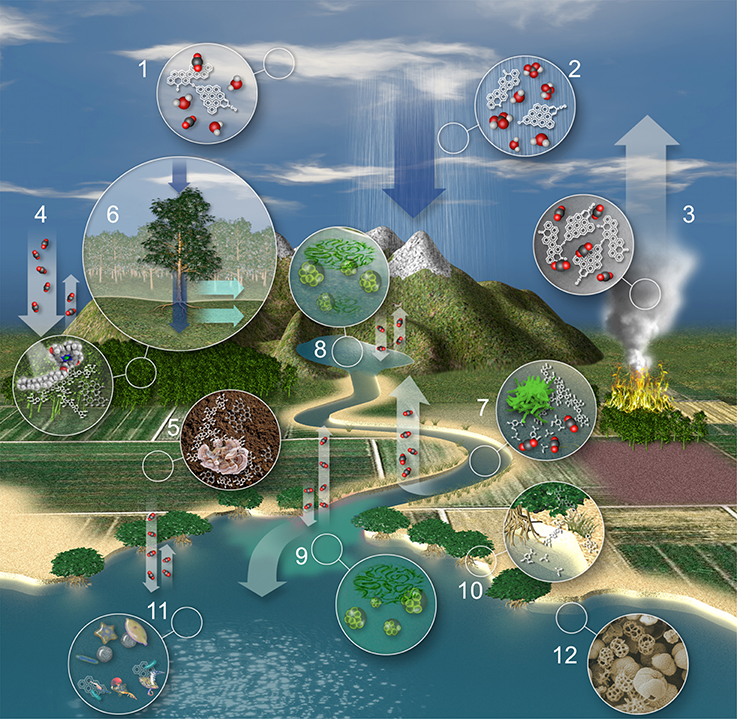
Where carbon goes when water flows

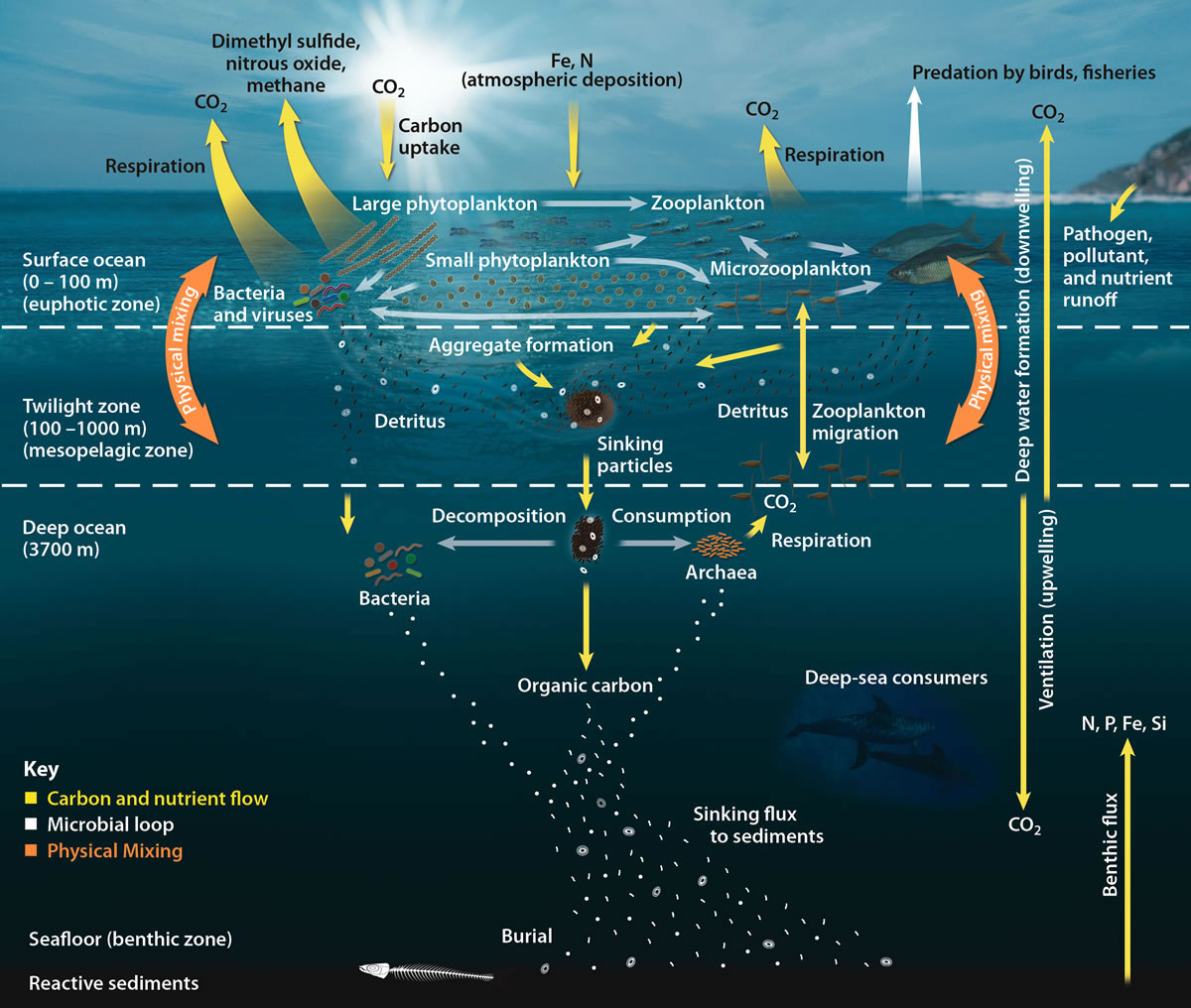
Oceanic carbon cycle

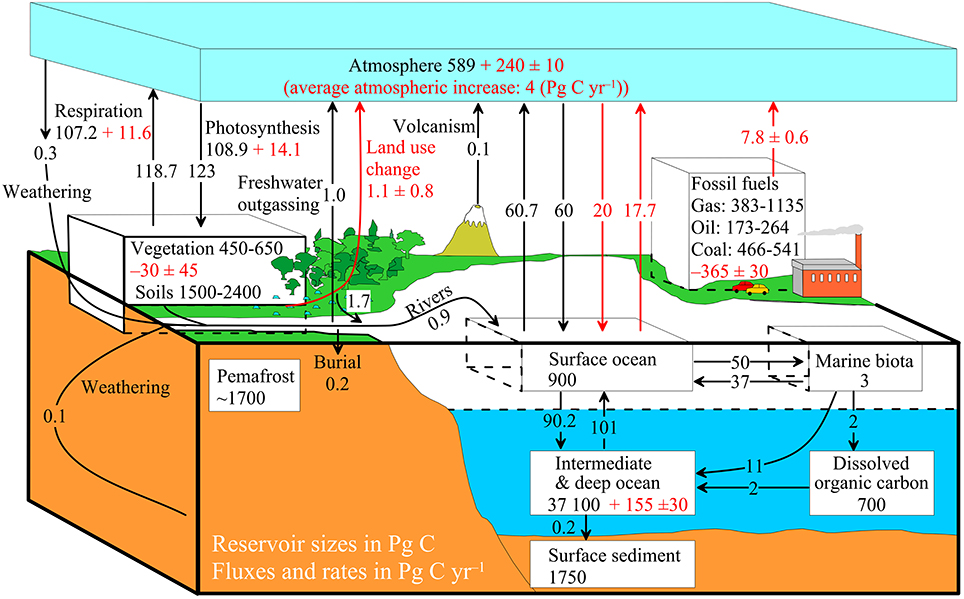
Simplified diagram of the global carbon cycle

Carbon cycle diagram

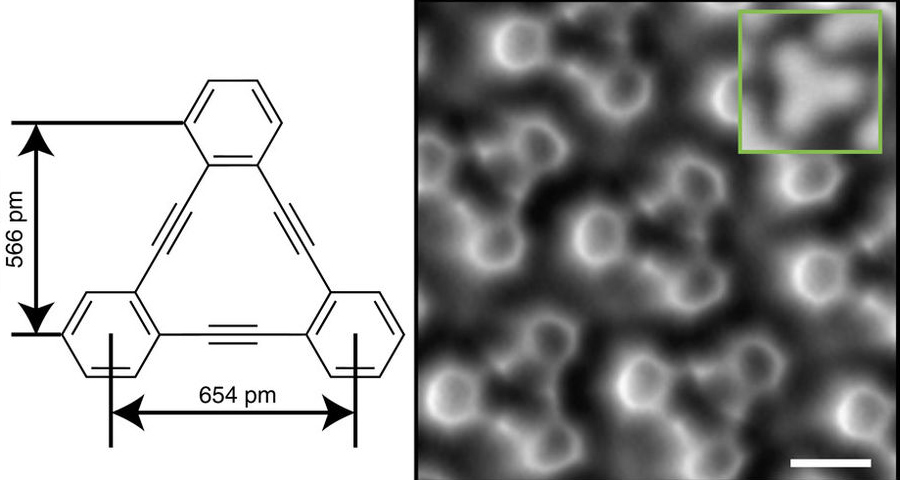
Triple bond of Carbon in Benzene

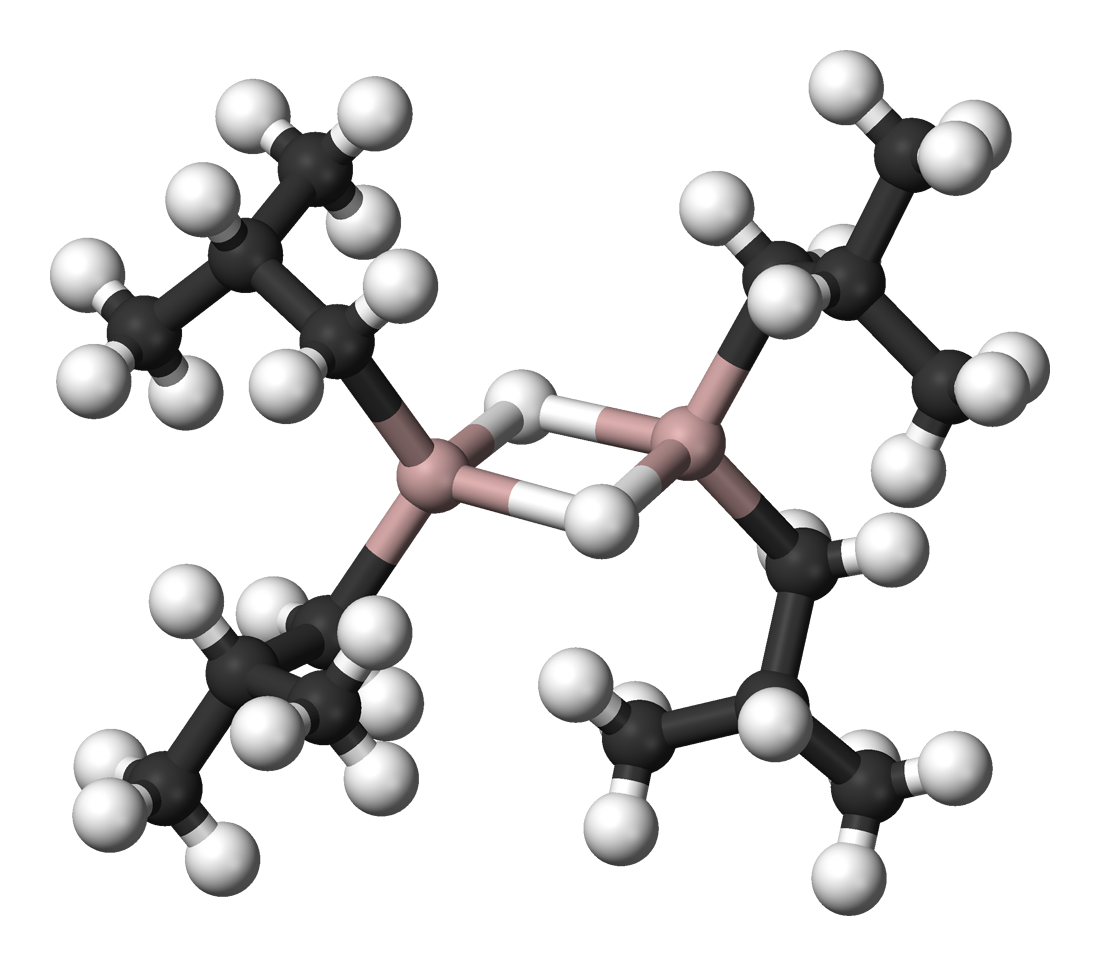
Model of diisobutylaluminium hydride, showing aluminium as pink, bonded to carbon in black, and hydrogen as white in Organoaluminium chemistry

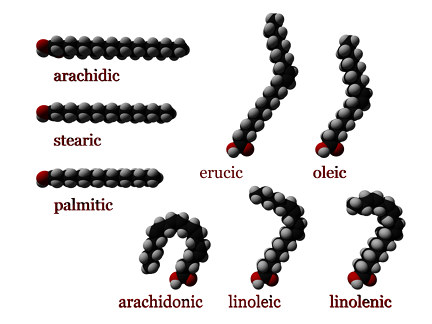
Fatty acids made of long chains of carbon

== See also ==
- Carbon source (biology)
- Cell biology
- CHONPS, a mnemonic acronym for the order of the most common elements in living organisms: carbon, hydrogen, oxygen, nitrogen, phosphorus, and sulfur
- Habitable zone for complex life
