= Particle chauvinism =

Assumption that normal matter is the basis of the universe

Particle chauvinism is the term used by British astrophysicist Martin Rees to describe the (allegedly erroneous) assumption that what we think of as normal matter—atoms, quarks, electrons, etc. (excluding dark matter or other matter)—is the basis of matter in the universe, rather than a rare phenomenon.

== Dominance of dark matter ==
With the growing recognition in the late 20th century of the presence of dark matter in the universe, ordinary baryonic matter has come to be seen as something of a cosmic afterthought. As J.D. Barrow put it:

"This would be the final Copernican twist in our status in the material universe. Not only are we not at the center of the universe: We are not even made of the predominant form of matter."

The 21st century saw the share of baryonic matter in the total mass-energy of the universe downgraded further, to perhaps as low as 1%, further extending what has been called the demise of particle-chauvinism, before being revised up to some 5% of the contents of the universe.

== See also ==
- Anthropic principle
- Carbon chauvinism
- Mediocrity principle
