= Our Final Hour =

2003 book by Martin Rees

Our Final Hour: A Scientist's Warning: How Terror, Error, and Environmental Disaster Threaten Humankind's Future In This Century—On Earth and Beyond.
- Author: Sir Martin Rees
- Genre: Science
- Publisher: Basic Books
- Publication date: 2003
- Media type: Hardcover
- ISBN: 0-465-06862-6

Our Final Hour is a 2003 book by the British Astronomer Royal Sir Martin Rees. The full title of the book is Our Final Hour: A Scientist's Warning: How Terror, Error, and Environmental Disaster Threaten Humankind's Future In This Century—On Earth and Beyond. It was published in the United Kingdom under the title Our Final Century: Will the Human Race Survive the Twenty-first Century?.

The premise of the book is that the Earth and human survival are in far greater danger from the potential effects of modern technology than is commonly realised, and that the 21st century may be a critical moment in history when humanity's fate is decided. Rees discusses a range of existential risks confronting humanity, and estimates that the probability of extinction before 2100 CE is around 50 percent, based on the possibility of malign or accidental release of destructive technology.

== Humanity's fate and recommendations for survival ==
In Our Final Hour, Rees explores various risks of human extinction and their likelihood, notably those caused by the unchecked consequences of new technologies (such as nanotechnology or machine superintelligence), uncontrolled scientific experimentation, terrorist or fundamentalist violence, or destruction of the biosphere. He suggests that humanity's chances of survival could be improved by expanding into space.

In order to avoid human extinction, Rees advocates for worldwide regulation of some types of scientific research, and control of open access to such research.

Rees has long been active in disarmament campaigns, and although he now sees nuclear warfare as a less probable cause of extinction, he advocates arms control as much as control of science and technology (see also World government).

More concerning to him now is the possibility of major bioterrorist attacks, as evidenced by his outstanding bet (registered with the Long Bet Project) that such events will occur within the next twenty years. He states that, in the 1990s, Aum Shinrikyo tried unsuccessfully to obtain an Ebola virus sample, which they could now create in their Mount Fuji lab, using ingredients and instructions from the Internet.

Rees advocates free market-based options for space exploration and survival through colonization, and believes that the wealthy will push back the frontiers of space.

== Publication data ==
- Sir Martin Rees, Our Final Hour: A Scientist's Warning: How Terror, Error, and Environmental Disaster Threaten Humankind's Future In This Century—On Earth and Beyond (2003), Basic Books, hardcover: ISBN 0-465-06862-6, 2004 paperback: ISBN 0-465-06863-4
- Sir Martin Rees, Our Final Century?: Will the Human Race Survive the Twenty-first Century? (2003) (UK) William Heinemann, hardcover: ISBN 0-434-00809-5, 2004 Arrow paperback: ISBN 0-09-943686-8
