= Extraterrestrial life =

Life that does not originate on Earth

Unsolved problem in astronomy
Could life have arisen elsewhere?
What are the requirements for life?
Are there exoplanets like Earth?
How likely is the evolution of intelligent life?
More unsolved problems in astronomy

Extraterrestrial life, or alien life (colloquially aliens), is life that originates from another world rather than on Earth. No extraterrestrial life has yet been detected. Such life might range from simple forms such as microbes to intelligent beings, possibly bringing forth civilizations that might be far more, or far less, advanced than humans. The science of extraterrestrial life is known as astrobiology.

Speculation about inhabited worlds beyond Earth dates back to antiquity. Early Christian writers, including Augustine, discussed ideas from thinkers like Democritus and Epicurus about countless worlds in the vast universe. Pre-modern writers typically assumed extraterrestrial "worlds" were inhabited by living beings. William Vorilong, in the 15th century, acknowledged the possibility Jesus could have visited extraterrestrial worlds to redeem their inhabitants. In 1440, Nicholas of Cusa suggested Earth is a "brilliant star"; he theorized that all celestial bodies, even the Sun, could host life. Descartes wrote that there were no means to prove the stars were not inhabited by "intelligent creatures", but their existence was a matter of speculation.

In comparison to the life-abundant Earth, the vast majority of intrasolar and extrasolar planets and moons have harsh surface conditions and disparate atmospheric chemistry, or lack an atmosphere. However, there are many extreme and chemically harsh ecosystems on Earth that do support forms of life and are often hypothesized to be the origin of life on Earth. Examples include life surrounding hydrothermal vents, acidic hot springs, and volcanic lakes, as well as halophiles and the deep biosphere.

Since the mid-20th century, researchers have searched for extraterrestrial life and intelligence, such as with the Project Ozma experiment in 1960, and the NASA Viking program's search for life on Mars. Thought experiments such as the Drake equation have been developed, speculating on the existence and probability of sapient life elsewhere in the universe. Current solar system studies focus on Venus, Mars, Europa, and Titan as candidates for potential life; meanwhile, exoplanet discoveries from 1989 to the present day now total 6,464 confirmed planets in 4,849 systems as of November 2026. Depending on the category of search, methods range from analysis of telescope and specimen data to radios used to detect and transmit interstellar communication. Interstellar travel remains largely hypothetical, with only the Voyager 1 and Voyager 2 probes confirmed to have entered the interstellar medium.

The concept of extraterrestrial life, especially intelligent life, has greatly influenced culture and fiction, being a major staple of science fiction. A key debate centres on contacting extraterrestrial intelligence: some advocate active attempts, while others warn it could be risky, given human history of exploiting other societies.

== Context ==
Using Big Bang models for the timeline of the universe, it was too hot for life for the first 15 million years and the elements of organic life, created through stellar fusion, did not exist for at least 50 million years. The first organic compounds may have formed in the protoplanetary disk of dust grains that would eventually create rocky planets like Earth. Although Earth was in a molten state after its birth and may have burned any organics that fell on it, it would have been more hospitable as it cooled. Once the right conditions were present, life on Earth started by a chemical process known as abiogenesis.

During most of its stellar evolution, stars combine hydrogen nuclei to make helium nuclei by stellar fusion, and the comparatively lighter weight of helium allows the star to release the extra energy. The process continues until the star uses all of its available fuel, with the speed of consumption being related to the size of the star. During its last stages, stars start combining helium nuclei to form carbon nuclei. The larger stars can further combine carbon nuclei to create oxygen and silicon, oxygen into neon and sulphur, and so on until iron. Ultimately, the star blows much of its content back into the stellar medium, where it would join clouds that would eventually become new generations of stars and planets. Many of those materials are the raw components of life on Earth. As this process takes place in all the universe, said materials are ubiquitous in the cosmos and not a rarity unique to the Solar System.

The Solar System is a planetary system and part of the Milky Way galaxy. The Milky Way is part of the Local Group, a galaxy group that is in turn part of the Laniakea Supercluster. The universe is composed of all similar structures in existence. The immense distances between celestial objects are a difficulty for studying extraterrestrial life. So far, humans have only set foot on the Moon and sent robotic probes to other planets and moons in the Solar System. Although probes can withstand conditions that may be lethal to humans, the distances cause time delays: the New Horizons took nine years after launch to reach Pluto. No probe has ever reached extrasolar planetary systems. The Voyager 2 left the Solar System at a speed of 50,000 kilometres per hour; if it headed towards the Alpha Centauri system, the closest one to Earth at 4.4 light years, it would reach it in 100,000 years. Under current technology, such systems can only be studied by telescopes, which have limitations. It is estimated that dark matter has a larger amount of combined matter than stars and gas clouds, but as it plays no role in the stellar evolution of stars and planets, it is usually not taken into account by astrobiology.

In the circumstellar habitable zone or "Goldilocks zone" around a star, water may be at the right temperature to exist in liquid form at a planetary surface. This area is neither too close to the star, where water would be heated to steam, nor too far away, where water would be frozen to ice. However, planetary habitability is also defined by several additional factors. Being in the habitable zone is not enough to guarantee a planet is habitable, or that it even contains liquid water. Venus is located in the solar system's habitable zone, but does not have liquid water because of the conditions of its atmosphere. In contrast, the planetary mass moon Europa that is beyond the habitable zone likely contains liquid water under its frozen surface; heat from tidal flexing likely causes the subsurface ocean to remain liquid. Jovian planets or gas giants are not considered habitable even if they orbit close enough to their stars as hot Jupiters, due to crushing atmospheric pressures. The actual distances for the habitable zones vary according to the type of star, and even the solar activity of each specific star influences the local habitability. The type of star also defines the time the habitable zone will exist, as its presence and limits will change along with the star's stellar evolution.

The Big Bang occurred 13.8 billion years ago, the Solar System was formed 4.6 billion years ago, and the first hominids appeared 6 million years ago. Life on other planets may have started, evolved, given birth to extraterrestrial intelligences, and perhaps even faced a planetary extinction event millions or billions of years ago. When considered from a cosmic perspective, the brief times of existence of Earth's species may suggest that extraterrestrial life may be equally fleeting under such a scale.

During a period of about 7 million years, from about 10 to 17 million years after the Big Bang, the background temperature was between 373 and 273 K (100 and 0 °C; 212 and 32 °F), allowing the possibility of liquid water if any planets existed. Avi Loeb (2014) speculated that primitive life might in principle have appeared during this window, which he called "the Habitable Epoch of the Early Universe".

Life on Earth is ubiquitous across the planet and has adapted to almost all available environments; extremophiles and the deep biosphere thrive at even the most hostile ones. As a result, it is inferred that life in other celestial bodies may be equally adaptive. However, the origin of life is unrelated to its ease of adaptation and may have stricter requirements. A celestial body may not have any life on it, even if it were habitable.

== Likelihood of existence ==
Life in the cosmos beyond Earth has never been observed, but it is expected. The hypothesis of ubiquitous extraterrestrial life relies on three main ideas. The first one, the size of the universe, allows for plenty of planets to have a similar habitability to Earth, and the age of the universe gives enough time for a long process analogue to the history of Earth to happen there. The second is that the substances that make life, such as carbon and water, are ubiquitous in the universe. The third is that the physical laws are universal, which means that the forces that would facilitate or prevent the existence of life would be the same ones as on Earth. According to this argument, made by scientists such as Carl Sagan and Stephen Hawking, it would be improbable for life not to exist somewhere else other than Earth. This argument is embodied in the Copernican principle, which states that Earth does not occupy a unique position in the Universe, and the mediocrity principle, which states that there is nothing special about life on Earth.

Other authors consider instead that life in the cosmos, or at least multicellular life, may actually be rare. The Rare Earth hypothesis maintains that life on Earth is possible because of a series of factors that range from the location in the galaxy and the configuration of the Solar System to local characteristics of the planet, and that it is unlikely that another planet simultaneously meets all such requirements. The proponents of this hypothesis consider that very little evidence suggests the existence of extraterrestrial life and that, at this point, it is just a desired result and not a reasonable scientific explanation for any gathered data. Some historians have argued that a review of the history of the idea of extraterrestrial life supports this view.

=== Drake equation ===
In 1961, astronomer and astrophysicist Frank Drake devised the Drake equation as a way to stimulate scientific dialogue at a meeting on the search for extraterrestrial intelligence (SETI). The Drake equation is a probabilistic argument used to estimate the number of active, communicative extraterrestrial civilizations in the Milky Way galaxy. The Drake equation is:

$$N = R_{\ast} \cdot f_p \cdot n_e \cdot f_{\ell} \cdot f_i \cdot f_c \cdot L$$

where:

N = the number of Milky Way galaxy civilizations communicating across interplanetary space

and

R_{*} = the rate of formation of stars suitable for intelligent life in our galaxy
f_{p} = the fraction of those stars that have planets
n_{e} = the average number of planets that can potentially support life
f_{l} = the fraction of planets that actually support life
f_{i} = the fraction of planets with life that evolves to become intelligent life (civilisations)
f_{c} = the fraction of civilizations that develop a technology to broadcast detectable signs of their existence into space
L = the length of time over which such civilizations broadcast detectable signals into space

Drake's proposed estimates are as follows, but numbers on the right side of the equation are agreed as speculative and open to substitution:

$10{,}000 = 5 \cdot 0.5 \cdot 2 \cdot 1 \cdot 0.2 \cdot 1 \cdot 10{,}000$

The Drake equation has proved controversial since, although it is written as a math equation, none of its values were known at the time. Although some values may eventually be measured, others are based on social sciences and are not knowable by their very nature. This does not allow one to make noteworthy conclusions from the equation.

Based on observations from the Hubble Space Telescope, there are nearly 2 trillion galaxies in the observable universe. It is estimated that at least ten percent of all Sun-like stars have a system of planets. In other words, there are 6.25×10^{18} stars with planets orbiting them in the observable universe. Even if it is assumed that only one out of a billion of these stars has planets supporting life, there would be some 6.25 billion life-supporting planetary systems in the observable universe. A 2013 study based on results from the Kepler spacecraft estimated that the Milky Way contains at least as many planets as it does stars, resulting in 100–400 billion exoplanets. The nebular hypothesis that explains the formation of the Solar System and other planetary systems would suggest that those can have several configurations, and not all of them may have rocky planets within the habitable zone.

The apparent contradiction between high estimates of the probability of the existence of extraterrestrial civilisations and the lack of evidence for such civilisations is known as the Fermi paradox. Zhi-Wei Wang and Samuel L. Braunstein suggest that a random universe capable of supporting life is likely to be just barely able to do so, giving a potential explanation to the Fermi paradox. Dennis Danielson and Christopher Graney have argued that the Paradox is an artefact of history rather than of science. They show that, in the 17th and 18th centuries, the presumption that planets suitable for organic life are abundant became established in the absence of scientific evidence to support it, or even despite the scientific evidence then available against it. The presumption endured into the present day despite evidence for planetary and stellar diversity that has accumulated since the late 19th century. Thus, in their view, what is seen as the Fermi Paradox is simply science overcoming a historical presumption that never adequately recognized the importance of discoveries about, for example, the nature of planets or the origin of life.

== Biochemical basis ==
If extraterrestrial life exists, it could range from simple microorganisms and multicellular organisms similar to animals or plants, to complex alien intelligences akin to humans. When scientists talk about extraterrestrial life, they consider all those types. Although it is possible that extraterrestrial life may have other configurations, scientists use the hierarchy of lifeforms from Earth for simplicity, as it is the only one known to exist.

The first basic requirement for life is an environment with non-equilibrium thermodynamics, which means that the thermodynamic equilibrium must be broken by a source of energy. The traditional sources of energy in the cosmos are the stars, such as for life on Earth, which depends on the energy of the sun. However, there are other alternative energy sources, such as volcanoes, plate tectonics, and hydrothermal vents. There are ecosystems on Earth in deep areas of the ocean that do not receive sunlight, and take energy from black smokers instead. Magnetic fields and radioactivity have also been proposed as sources of energy, although they would be less efficient.

Life on Earth requires water in a liquid state as a solvent in which biochemical reactions take place. It is highly unlikely that an abiogenesis process can start within a gaseous or solid medium: the atom speeds, either too fast or too slow, make it difficult for specific ones to meet and start chemical reactions. A liquid medium also allows the transport of nutrients and substances required for metabolism. Sufficient quantities of carbon and other elements, along with water, might enable the formation of living organisms on terrestrial planets with a chemical make-up and temperature range similar to that of Earth. Life based on ammonia rather than water has been suggested as an alternative, though this solvent appears less suitable than water. It is also conceivable that there are forms of life whose solvent is a liquid hydrocarbon such as methane, ethane or propane.

Another unknown aspect of potential extraterrestrial life would be the chemical elements that would compose it. Life on Earth is largely composed of carbon, but there could be other hypothetical types of biochemistry. A replacement for carbon would need to be able to create complex molecules, store information required for evolution, and be freely available in the medium. To create DNA, RNA, or a close analogue, such an element should be able to bind its atoms with many others, creating complex and stable molecules. It should be able to create at least three covalent bonds: two for making long strings and at least a third to add new links and allow for diverse information. Only nine elements meet this requirement: boron, nitrogen, phosphorus, arsenic, antimony (three bonds), carbon, silicon, germanium and tin (four bonds). As for abundance, carbon, nitrogen, and silicon are the most abundant in the universe. On Earth's crust, the most abundant of those elements is silicon; in the hydrosphere, it is carbon; and in the atmosphere, it is carbon and nitrogen. Silicon has disadvantages over carbon; for example, molecules formed with silicon atoms are less stable and more vulnerable to acids, oxygen, and light. An ecosystem of silicon-based lifeforms would require very low temperatures, high atmospheric pressure, an atmosphere devoid of oxygen, and a solvent other than water. The low temperatures required would add the difficulty of kickstarting abiogenesis to create life in the first place. Norman Horowitz, head of the Jet Propulsion Laboratory bioscience section for the Mariner and Viking missions from 1965 to 1976 considered that the great versatility of the carbon atom makes it the element most likely to provide solutions, even exotic solutions, to the problems of survival of life on other planets. However, he also considered that the conditions found on Mars were incompatible with carbon based life.

Even if extraterrestrial life is based on carbon and uses water as a solvent, like Earth life, it may still have a radically different biochemistry. Life is generally considered to be a product of natural selection. It has been proposed that to undergo natural selection a living entity must have the capacity to replicate itself, the capacity to avoid damage and decay, and the capacity to acquire and process resources in support of the first two capacities. Life on Earth may have started with an RNA world and later evolved to its current form, where some of the RNA tasks were transferred to DNA and proteins. Extraterrestrial life may be using RNA, or it may have evolved into other configurations. It is unclear if our biochemistry is the most efficient one that could be generated, or which elements would follow a similar pattern. However, it is likely that, even if cells had a different composition to those from Earth, they would still have a cell membrane. Life on Earth jumped from prokaryotes to eukaryotes and from unicellular organisms to multicellular organisms through evolution. So far no alternative process to achieve such a result has been conceived, even if hypothetical. Evolution requires life to be divided into individual organisms, and no alternative organization has yet been satisfactorily proposed. At the basic level, membranes define a cell's boundary between it and its environment, while remaining partially open to that environment for the exchange of energy and resources.

The evolution from simple cells to eukaryotes, and from them to multicellular lifeforms, is not guaranteed. The Cambrian explosion took place thousands of millions of years after the origin of life, and its causes are not fully known yet. On the other hand, the jump to multicellularity took place several times, which suggests that it could be a case of convergent evolution, and so likely to take place on other planets as well. Palaeontologist Simon Conway Morris considers that convergent evolution would lead to kingdoms similar to our plants and animals, and that many features are likely to develop in alien animals as well, such as bilateral symmetry, limbs, digestive systems and heads with sensory organs. Scientists from the University of Oxford analysed it from the perspective of evolutionary theory and wrote in a study in the International Journal of Astrobiology that aliens may be similar to humans. The planetary context would also have an influence: a planet with higher gravity would have smaller animals, and other types of stars can lead to non-green photosynthesizers. The amount of energy available would also affect biodiversity, as an ecosystem sustained by black smokers or hydrothermal vents would have less energy available than those sustained by a star's light and heat, and so its lifeforms would not grow beyond a certain complexity. There is also research in assessing the capacity of life for developing intelligence. It has been suggested that this capacity arises with the number of potential niches a planet contains, and that the complexity of life itself is reflected in the information density of planetary environments, which in turn can be computed from its niches.

=== Harsh environmental conditions on Earth harbouring life ===
It is common knowledge that the conditions on other planets in the solar system, in addition to the many galaxies outside of the Milky Way galaxy, are very harsh and seem to be too extreme to harbour any life. The environmental conditions on these planets can have intense UV radiation paired with extreme temperatures, lack of water, and much more that can lead to conditions that don't seem to favour the creation or maintenance of extraterrestrial life. However, there has been much historical evidence that some of the earliest and most basic forms of life on Earth originated in some extreme environments that seem unlikely to have harboured life at least at one point in Earth's history. Fossil evidence as well as many historical theories backed up by years of research and studies have marked environments like hydrothermal vents or acidic hot springs as some of the first places that life could have originated on Earth. These environments can be considered extreme when compared to the typical ecosystems that the majority of life on Earth now inhabit, as hydrothermal vents are scorching hot due to the magma escaping from the Earth's mantle and meeting the much colder oceanic water. Even in today's world, there can be a diverse population of bacteria found inhabiting the area surrounding these hydrothermal vents which can suggest that some form of life can be supported even in the harshest of environments like the other planets in the solar system.

The aspects of these harsh environments that make them ideal for the origin of life on Earth, as well as the possibility of creation of life on other planets, is the chemical reactions forming spontaneously. For example, the hydrothermal vents found on the ocean floor are known to support many chemosynthetic processes which allow organisms to utilize energy through reduced chemical compounds that fix carbon. In return, these reactions will allow for organisms to live in relatively low oxygenated environments while maintaining enough energy to support themselves. The early Earth environment was reducing and therefore, these carbon fixing compounds were necessary for the survival and possible origin of life on Earth. With the little amount of information that scientists have found regarding the atmosphere on other planets in the Milky Way galaxy and beyond, the atmospheres are most likely reducing or with very low oxygen levels, especially when compared with Earth's atmosphere. If there were the necessary elements and ions on these planets, the same carbon fixing, reduced chemical compounds occurring around hydrothermal vents could also occur on these planets' surfaces and possibly result in the origin of extraterrestrial life.

== Planetary habitability in the Solar System ==
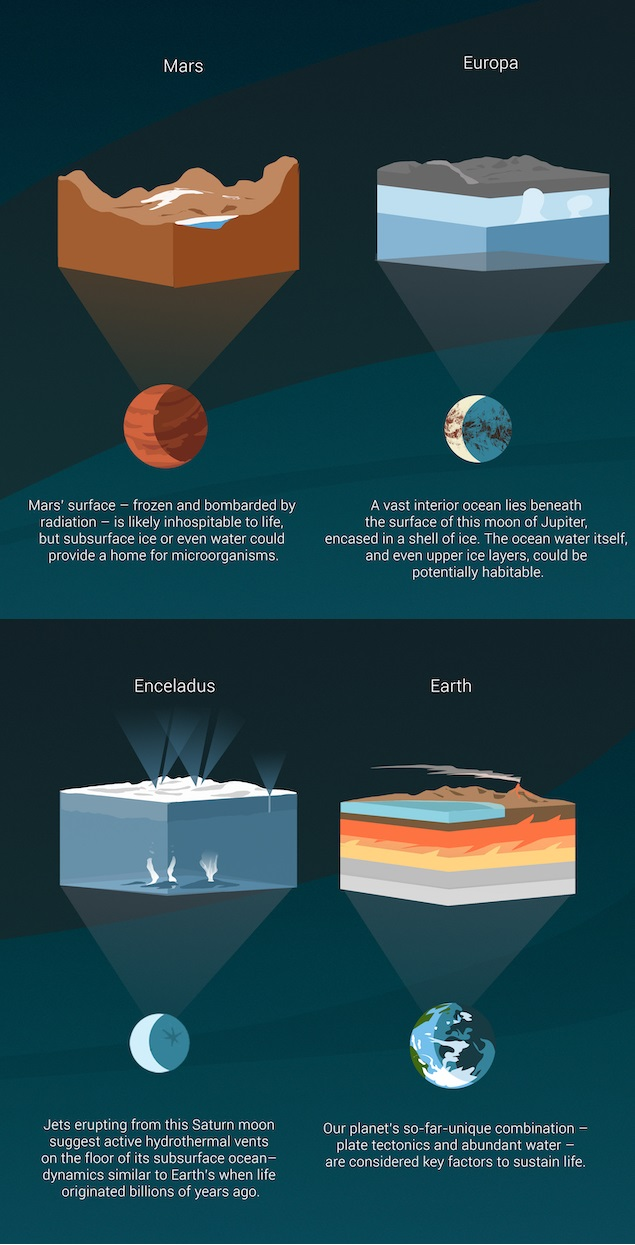
Besides Earth, Mars, Europa and Enceladus are the most likely places in the Solar System to find life.

The Solar System has a wide variety of planets, dwarf planets, and moons, and each one is studied for its potential to host life. Each one has its own specific conditions that may benefit or harm life. So far, the only lifeforms found are those from Earth. No extraterrestrial intelligence other than humans exists or has ever existed within the Solar System. Astrobiologist Mary Voytek points out that it would be unlikely to find large ecosystems, as they would have already been detected by now.

The inner Solar System is likely devoid of life. However, Venus is still of interest to astrobiologists, as it is a terrestrial planet that was likely similar to Earth in its early stages and developed in a different way. There is a greenhouse effect, the surface is the hottest in the Solar System, it is covered in sulphuric acid clouds, all surface liquid water is lost, and it has a thick carbon-dioxide atmosphere with huge pressure. Comparing both helps to understand the precise differences that lead to beneficial or harmful conditions for life. And despite the conditions against life on Venus, there are suspicions that microbial life-forms may still survive in high-altitude clouds.

Mars is a cold and almost airless desert, inhospitable to life. However, recent studies revealed that water on Mars used to be quite abundant, forming rivers, lakes, and perhaps even oceans. Mars may have been habitable back then, and life on Mars may have been possible. But when the planetary core ceased to generate a magnetic field, solar winds removed the atmosphere and the planet became vulnerable to solar radiation. Ancient life-forms may still have left fossilised remains, and microbes may still survive deep underground.

As mentioned, the gas giants and ice giants are unlikely to contain life. The most distant solar system bodies, found in the Kuiper Belt and outwards, are locked in permanent deep-freeze, but cannot be ruled out completely.

Although the giant planets themselves are highly unlikely to have life, there is much hope to find it on moons orbiting these planets. Europa, from the Jovian system, has a subsurface ocean below a thick layer of ice. Ganymede and Callisto also have subsurface oceans, but life is less likely in them because water is sandwiched between layers of solid ice. Europa would have contact between the ocean and the rocky surface, which helps the chemical reactions. It may be difficult to dig so deep in order to study those oceans, though. Enceladus, a tiny moon of Saturn with another subsurface ocean, may not need to be dug, as it releases water to space in eruption columns. The space probe Cassini flew inside one of these, but could not make a full study because NASA did not expect this phenomenon and did not equip the probe to study ocean water. Still, Cassini detected complex organic molecules, salts, evidence of hydrothermal activity, hydrogen, and methane.

Titan is the only celestial body in the Solar System besides Earth that has liquid bodies on the surface. It has rivers, lakes, and rain of hydrocarbons, methane, and ethane, and even a cycle similar to Earth's water cycle. This special context encourages speculations about lifeforms with different biochemistry, but the cold temperatures would make such chemistry take place at a very slow pace. Water is rock-solid on the surface, but Titan does have a subsurface water ocean like several other moons. However, it is of such a great depth that it would be very difficult to access it for study.

== Scientific search ==
The science that searches and studies life in the universe, both on Earth and elsewhere, is called astrobiology. With the study of Earth's life, the only known form of life, astrobiology seeks to study how life starts and evolves and the requirements for its continuous existence. This helps to determine what to look for when searching for life in other celestial bodies. This is a complex area of study, and uses the combined perspectives of several scientific disciplines, such as astronomy, biology, chemistry, geology, oceanography, and atmospheric sciences.

The scientific search for extraterrestrial life is being carried out both directly and indirectly. As of 5 November 2026, there are 6,464 confirmed exoplanets in 4,849 planetary systems, with 1,074 systems having more than one planet. Other planets and moons in the Solar System hold the potential for hosting primitive life such as microorganisms. As of 8 February 2021, an updated status of studies considering the possible detection of lifeforms on Venus (via phosphine) and Mars (via methane) was reported.

=== Search for basic life ===
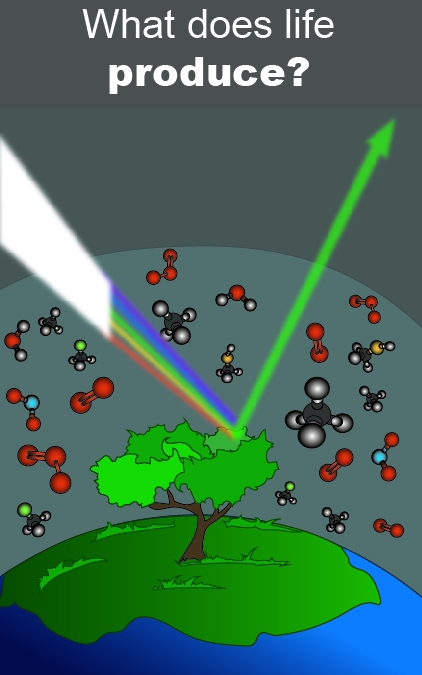
Lifeforms produce a variety of biosignatures that may be detectable by telescopes.

Scientists search for biosignatures within the Solar System by studying planetary surfaces and examining meteorites. Some claim to have identified evidence that microbial life has existed on Mars. In 1996, a controversial report stated that structures resembling nanobacteria were discovered in a meteorite, ALH84001, formed of rock ejected from Mars. Although all the unusual properties of the meteorite were eventually explained as the result of inorganic processes, the controversy over its discovery laid the groundwork for the development of astrobiology.

An experiment on the two Viking Mars landers reported gas emissions from heated Martian soil samples that some scientists argue are consistent with the presence of living microorganisms. Lack of corroborating evidence from other experiments on the same samples suggests that a non-biological reaction is a more likely hypothesis.

In February 2005 NASA scientists reported they may have found some evidence of extraterrestrial life on Mars. The two scientists, Carol Stoker and Larry Lemke of NASA's Ames Research Center, based their claim on methane signatures found in Mars's atmosphere resembling the methane production of some forms of primitive life on Earth, as well as on their own study of primitive life near the Rio Tinto river in Spain. NASA officials soon distanced NASA from the scientists' claims, and Stoker herself backed off from her initial assertions.

In November 2011, NASA launched the Mars Science Laboratory that landed the Curiosity rover on Mars. It is designed to assess the past and present habitability on Mars using a variety of scientific instruments. The rover landed on Mars at Gale Crater in August 2012.

A group of scientists at Cornell University started a catalogue of microorganisms, with the way each one reacts to sunlight. The goal is to help with the search for similar organisms in exoplanets, as the starlight reflected by planets rich in such organisms would have a specific spectrum, unlike that of starlight reflected from lifeless planets. If Earth was studied from afar with this system, it would reveal a shade of green, as a result of the abundance of plants with photosynthesis.

In August 2011, NASA studied meteorites found on Antarctica, finding adenine, guanine, hypoxanthine, and xanthine. Adenine and guanine are components of DNA, and the others are used in other biological processes. The studies ruled out pollution of the meteorites on Earth, as those components would not be freely available the way they were found in the samples. This discovery suggests that several organic molecules that serve as building blocks of life may be generated within asteroids and comets. In October 2011, scientists reported that cosmic dust contains complex organic compounds ("amorphous organic solids with a mixed aromatic-aliphatic structure") that could be created naturally, and rapidly, by stars. It is still unclear if those compounds played a role in the creation of life on Earth, but Sun Kwok, of the University of Hong Kong, thinks so. "If this is the case, life on Earth may have had an easier time getting started as these organics can serve as basic ingredients for life."

In August 2012, and in a world first, astronomers at Copenhagen University reported the detection of a specific sugar molecule, glycolaldehyde, in a distant star system. The molecule was found around the protostellar binary IRAS 16293-2422, which is located 400 light years from Earth. Glycolaldehyde is needed to form ribonucleic acid, or RNA, which is similar in function to DNA. This finding suggests that complex organic molecules may form in stellar systems prior to the formation of planets, eventually arriving on young planets early in their formation.

In December 2023, astronomers reported the first time discovery, in the plumes of Enceladus, moon of the planet Saturn, of hydrogen cyanide, a possible chemical essential for life as we know it, as well as other organic molecules, some of which are yet to be better identified and understood. According to the researchers, "these [newly discovered] compounds could potentially support extant microbial communities or drive complex organic synthesis leading to the origin of life."

=== Search for extraterrestrial intelligences ===
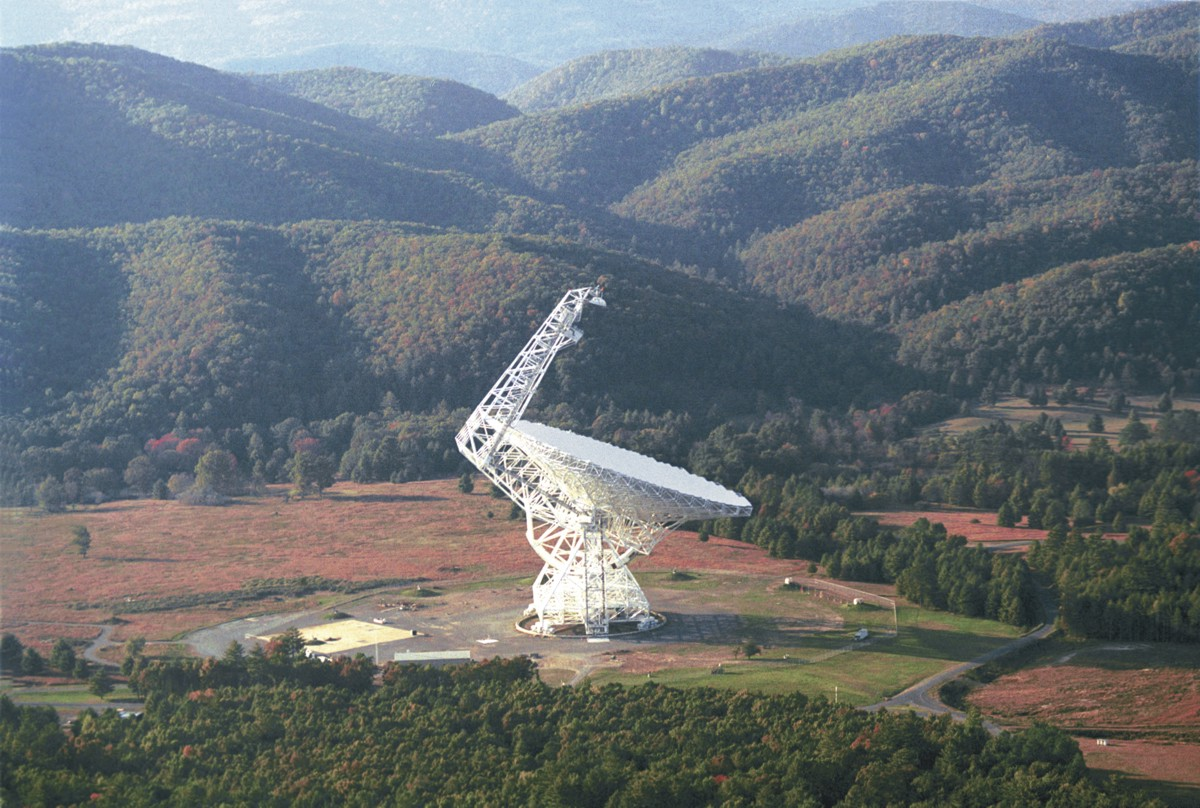
The Green Bank Telescope is one of the radio telescopes used by the Breakthrough Listen project to search for alien communications.

Although most searches are focused on the biology of extraterrestrial life, an extraterrestrial intelligence capable enough to develop a civilization may be detectable by other means as well. Technology may generate technosignatures, effects on the native planet that may not be caused by natural causes. There are three main types of techno-signatures considered: interstellar communications, effects on the atmosphere, and planetary-sized structures such as Dyson spheres.

Organizations such as the SETI Institute search the cosmos for potential forms of communication. They started with radio waves, and now search for laser pulses as well. The challenge for this search is that there are natural sources of such signals as well, such as gamma-ray bursts and supernovae, and the difference between a natural signal and an artificial one would be in its specific patterns. Astronomers intend to use artificial intelligence for this, as it can manage large amounts of data and is devoid of biases and preconceptions. Besides, even if there is an advanced extraterrestrial civilization, there is no guarantee that it is transmitting radio communications in the direction of Earth. The length of time required for a signal to travel across space means that a potential answer may arrive decades or centuries after the initial message.

The atmosphere of Earth is rich in nitrogen dioxide as a result of air pollution, which can be detectable. The natural abundance of carbon, which is also relatively reactive, makes it likely to be a basic component of the development of a potential extraterrestrial technological civilization, as it is on Earth. Fossil fuels may likely be generated and used on such worlds as well. The abundance of chlorofluorocarbons in the atmosphere can also be a clear technosignature, considering their role in ozone depletion. Light pollution may be another technosignature, as multiple lights on the night side of a rocky planet can be a sign of advanced technological development. However, modern telescopes are not strong enough to study exoplanets with the required level of detail to perceive it.

The Kardashev scale proposes that a civilization may eventually start consuming energy directly from its local star. This would require giant structures built next to it, called Dyson spheres. Those speculative structures would cause an excess infrared radiation, that telescopes may notice. The infrared radiation is typical of young stars, surrounded by dusty protoplanetary disks that will eventually form planets. An older star such as the Sun would have no natural reason to have excess infrared radiation. The presence of heavy elements in a star's light-spectrum is another potential biosignature; such elements would (in theory) be found if the star were being used as an incinerator/repository for nuclear waste products.

=== Extrasolar planets ===
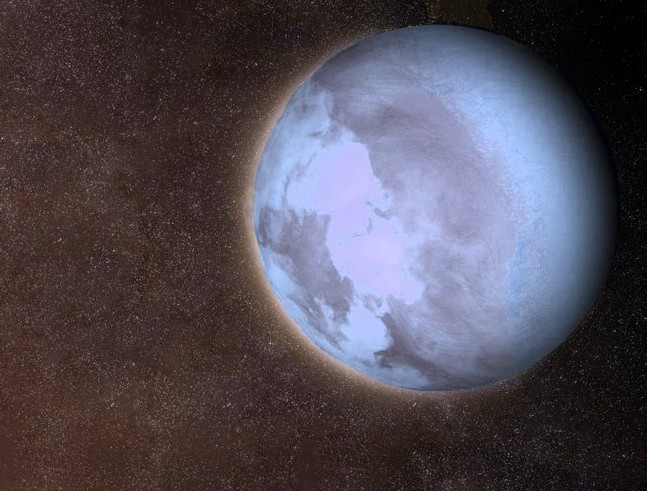
Artist's impression of Gliese 581 c, the first terrestrial extrasolar planet discovered within its star's habitable zone

Some astronomers search for extrasolar planets that may be conducive to life, narrowing the search to terrestrial planets within the habitable zones of their stars. Since 1992, over six thousand exoplanets have been discovered (6,464 planets in 4,849 planetary systems including 1,080 multiple planetary systems as of 5 November 2026).

The extrasolar planets so far discovered range in size from that of terrestrial planets similar to Earth's size to that of gas giants larger than Jupiter. The number of observed exoplanets is expected to increase greatly in the coming years. The Kepler space telescope has also detected a few thousand candidate planets, of which about 11% may be false positives.

There is at least one planet on average per star. About 1 in 5 Sun-like stars (Note: For the purpose of this 1 in 5 statistic, "Sun-like" means G-type star. Data for Sun-like stars wasn't available so this statistic is an extrapolation from data about K-type stars) have an "Earth-sized" (Note: For the purpose of this 1 in 5 statistic, Earth-sized means 1–2 Earth radii) planet in the habitable zone, (Note: For the purpose of this 1 in 5 statistic, "habitable zone" means the region with 0.25 to 4 times Earth's stellar flux (corresponding to 0.5–2 AU for the Sun).) with the nearest expected to be within 12 light-years distance from Earth. Assuming 200 billion stars in the Milky Way, (Note: About 1/4 of stars are GK Sun-like stars. The number of stars in the galaxy is not accurately known, but assuming 200 billion stars in total, the Milky Way would have about 50 billion Sun-like (GK) stars, of which about 1 in 5 (22%) or 11 billion would be Earth-sized in the habitable zone. Including red dwarfs would increase this to 40 billion.) that would be 11 billion potentially habitable Earth-sized planets in the Milky Way, rising to 40 billion if red dwarfs are included. The rogue planets in the Milky Way possibly number in the trillions.

The nearest known exoplanet is Proxima Centauri b, located 4.2 light-years (1.3 pc) from Earth in the southern constellation of Centaurus.

As of March 2014, the least massive exoplanet known is PSR B1257+12 A, which is about twice the mass of the Moon. The most massive planet listed on the NASA Exoplanet Archive is DENIS-P J082303.1−491201 b, about 29 times the mass of Jupiter, although according to most definitions of a planet, it is too massive to be a planet and may be a brown dwarf instead. Almost all of the planets detected so far are within the Milky Way, but there have also been a few possible detections of extragalactic planets. The study of planetary habitability also considers a wide range of other factors in determining the suitability of a planet for hosting life.

One sign that a planet probably already contains life is the presence of an atmosphere with significant amounts of oxygen, since that gas is highly reactive and generally would not last long without constant replenishment. This replenishment occurs on Earth through photosynthetic organisms. One way to analyse the atmosphere of an exoplanet is through spectrography when it transits its star, though this might only be feasible with dim stars like white dwarfs.

== History and cultural impact ==
=== Cosmic pluralism ===
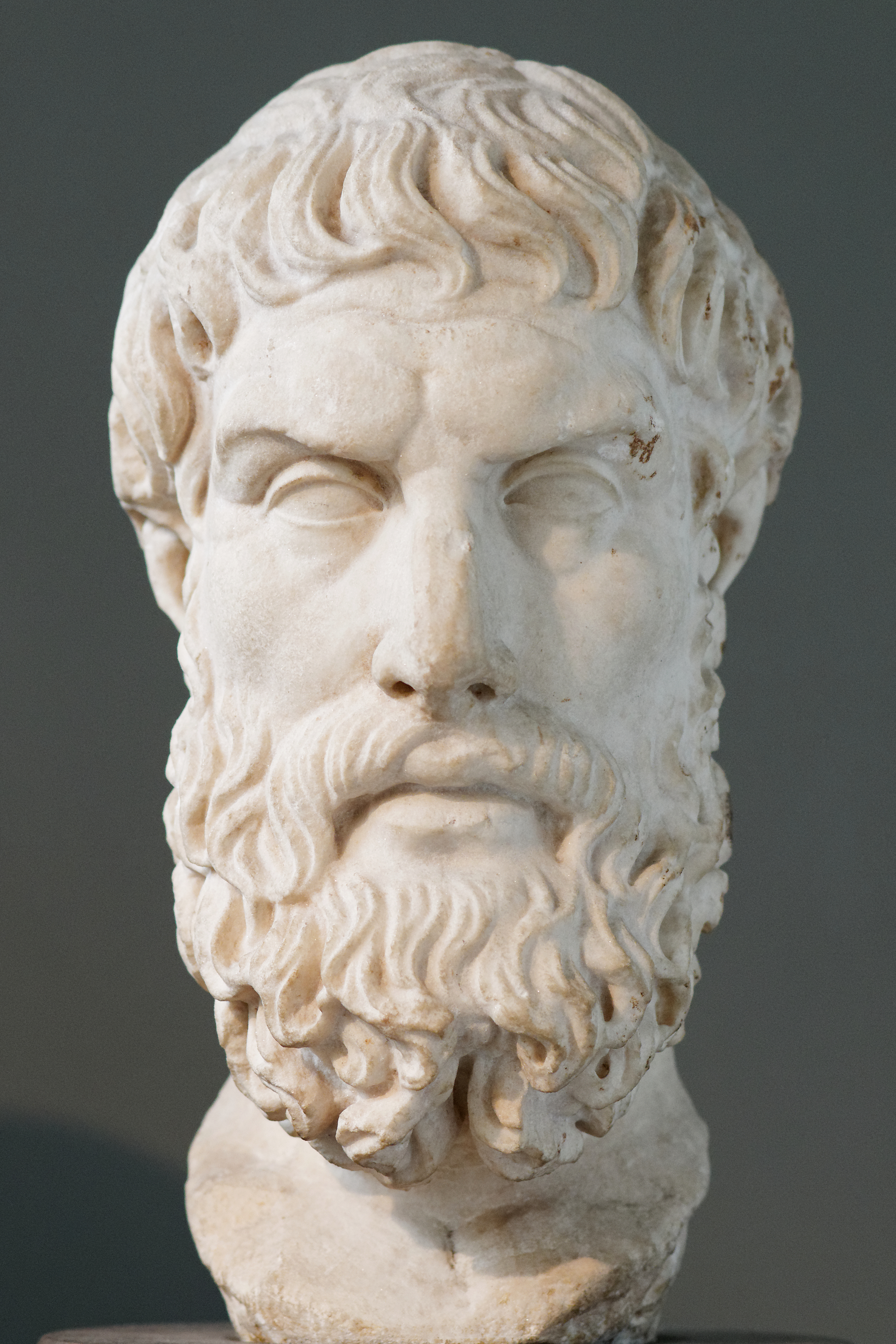
The Greek Epicurus proposed that other worlds may have their own animals and plants.

The modern concept of extraterrestrial life is based on assumptions that were not commonplace during the early days of astronomy. The first explanations for the celestial objects seen in the night sky were based on mythology. Scholars from Ancient Greece were the first to consider that the universe is inherently understandable and rejected explanations based on supernatural incomprehensible forces, such as the myth of the Sun being pulled across the sky in the chariot of Apollo. They had not developed the scientific method yet and based their ideas on pure thought and speculation, but they developed precursor ideas to it, such as that explanations had to be discarded if they contradict observable facts. The discussions of those Greek scholars established many of the pillars that would eventually lead to the idea of extraterrestrial life, such as Earth being round and not flat. The cosmos was first structured in a geocentric model that considered that the sun and all other celestial bodies revolve around Earth. However, they did not consider them as worlds. In Greek understanding, the world was composed by both Earth and the celestial objects with noticeable movements. Anaximander thought that the cosmos was made from apeiron, a substance that created the world, and that the world would eventually return to the cosmos.

Eventually two groups emerged, the atomists that thought that matter at both Earth and the cosmos was equally made of small atoms of the classical elements (earth, water, fire and air), and the Aristotelians who thought that those elements were exclusive of Earth and that the cosmos was made of a fifth one, the aether. Atomist Epicurus thought that the processes that created the world, its animals and plants should have created other worlds elsewhere, along with their own animals and plants. Aristotle thought instead that all the earth element naturally fell towards the centre of the universe, and that would make it impossible for other planets to exist elsewhere. Under that reasoning, Earth was not only in the centre, it was also the only planet in the universe.

Cosmic pluralism, the plurality of worlds, or simply pluralism, describes the philosophical belief in numerous "worlds" in addition to Earth, which might harbour extraterrestrial life. The earliest recorded assertion of extraterrestrial human life is found in ancient scriptures of Jainism. There are multiple "worlds" mentioned in Jain scriptures that support human life. These include, among others, Bharat Kshetra, Mahavideh Kshetra, Airavat Kshetra, and Hari Kshetra. Mediaeval Muslim writers like Fakhr al-Din al-Razi and Muhammad al-Baqir supported cosmic pluralism on the basis of the Qur'an. Chaucer's poem The House of Fame engaged in mediaeval thought experiments that postulated the plurality of worlds. However, those ideas about other worlds were different from the current knowledge about the structure of the universe, and did not postulate the existence of planetary systems other than the Solar System. When those authors talk about other worlds, they talk about places located at the centre of their own systems, and with their own stellar vaults and cosmos surrounding them.

The Greek ideas and the disputes between atomists and Aristotelians outlived the fall of the Greek empire. The Great Library of Alexandria compiled information about it, part of which was translated by Islamic scholars and thus survived the end of the Library. Baghdad combined the knowledge of the Greeks, the Indians, the Chinese and its own scholars, and the knowledge expanded through the Byzantine Empire. From there it eventually returned to Europe by the time of the Middle Ages. However, as the Greek atomist doctrine held that the world was created by random movements of atoms, with no need for a creator deity, it became associated with atheism, and the dispute intertwined with religious ones. Still, the Church did not react to those topics in a homogeneous way, and there were stricter and more permissive views within the church itself.

The first known mention of the term 'panspermia' was in the writings of the 5th-century BC Greek philosopher Anaxagoras. He proposed the idea that life exists everywhere.

=== Early modern period ===
Nicolaus Copernicus started the Copernican Revolution by proposing that the planets revolve around the sun rather than Earth. Under this heliocentric view, the notion of extraterrestrial life became feasible: if Earth is but just a planet orbiting around a star, there may be planets similar to Earth elsewhere. The astronomical study of distant bodies also proved that physical laws are the same elsewhere in the universe as on Earth, with nothing making the planet truly special.

The best-known early-modern proponent of ideas of extraterrestrial life was the Italian philosopher Giordano Bruno, who argued in the 16th century for an infinite universe in which every star is surrounded by its own planetary system. Bruno wrote that other worlds "have no less virtue nor a nature different to that of our earth" and, like Earth, "contain animals and inhabitants".

The heliocentric model was further strengthened by the postulation of the theory of gravity by Sir Isaac Newton. This theory provided the mathematics that explains the motions of all things in the universe, including planetary orbits. By this point, the geocentric model was definitely discarded. By this time, the use of the scientific method had become a standard, and new discoveries were expected to provide evidence and rigorous mathematical explanations. Science also took a deeper interest in the mechanics of natural phenomena, trying to explain not just the way nature works but also the reasons for working that way.

There was very little actual discussion about extraterrestrial life before this point, as the Aristotelian ideas remained influential while geocentrism was still accepted. When it was finally proved wrong, it not only meant that Earth was not the centre of the universe, but also that the lights seen in the sky were not just lights, but physical objects. The notion that life may exist in them as well soon became an ongoing topic of discussion, although one with no practical ways to investigate.

The possibility of extraterrestrials remained a widespread speculation as scientific discovery accelerated. William Herschel, the discoverer of Uranus, was one of many 18th–19th-century astronomers who believed that the Solar System is populated by alien life. Other scholars of the period who championed "cosmic pluralism" included Immanuel Kant and Benjamin Franklin. At the height of the Enlightenment, even the Sun and Moon were considered candidates for extraterrestrial inhabitants.

=== 19th century ===
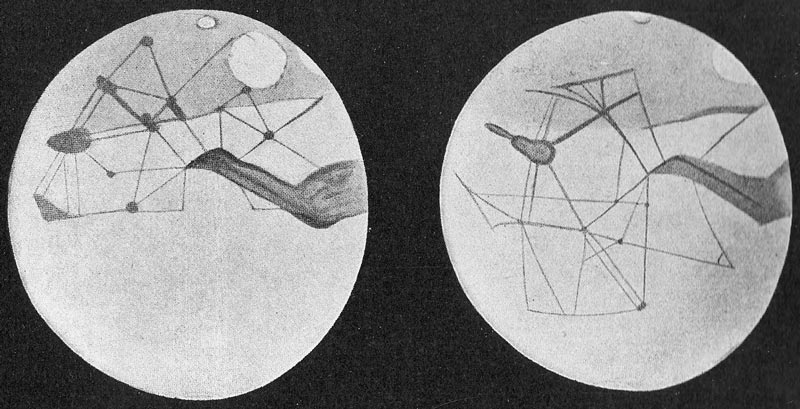
Artificial Martian channels, depicted by Percival Lowell

Speculation about life on Mars increased in the late 19th century, following telescopic observation of apparent Martian canals – which soon, however, turned out to be optical illusions. Despite this, in 1895, American astronomer Percival Lowell published his book Mars, followed by Mars and its Canals in 1906, proposing that the canals were the work of a long-gone civilisation.

Spectroscopic analysis of Mars's atmosphere began in earnest in 1894, when U.S. astronomer William Wallace Campbell showed that neither water nor oxygen was present in the Martian atmosphere. By 1909 better telescopes and the best perihelic opposition of Mars since 1877 conclusively put an end to the canal hypothesis.

As a consequence of the belief in the spontaneous generation there was little thought about the conditions of each celestial body: it was simply assumed that life would thrive anywhere. This theory was disproved by Louis Pasteur in the 19th century. Popular belief in thriving alien civilisations elsewhere in the solar system still remained strong until Mariner 4 and Mariner 9 provided close images of Mars, which debunked forever the idea of the existence of Martians and decreased the previous expectations of finding alien life in general. The end of the spontaneous generation belief forced investigation into the origin of life. Although abiogenesis is the more accepted theory, a number of authors reclaimed the term "panspermia" and proposed that life was brought to Earth from elsewhere. Some of those authors are Jöns Jacob Berzelius (1834), Kelvin (1871), Hermann von Helmholtz (1879) and, somewhat later, by Svante Arrhenius (1903).

The science fiction genre, although not so named during the time, developed during the late 19th century. The expansion of the genre of extraterrestrials in fiction influenced the popular perception over the real-life topic, making people eager to jump to conclusions about the discovery of aliens. Science marched at a slower pace, some discoveries fuelled expectations and others dashed excessive hopes. For example, with the advent of telescopes, most structures seen on the Moon or Mars were immediately attributed to Selenites or Martians, and later ones (such as more powerful telescopes) revealed that all such discoveries were natural features. A famous case is the Cydonia region of Mars, first imaged by the Viking 1 orbiter. The low-resolution photos showed a rock formation that resembled a human face, but later spacecraft took photos in higher detail that showed that there was nothing special about the site.

=== Recent history ===
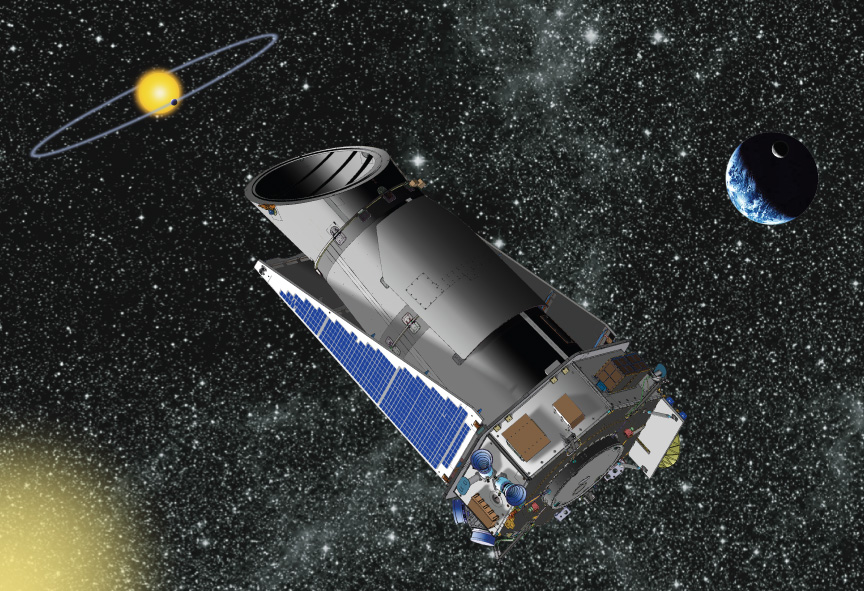
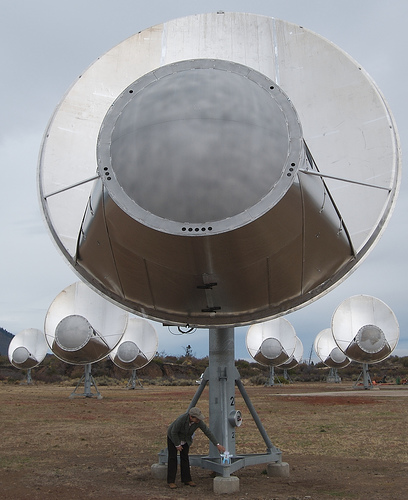
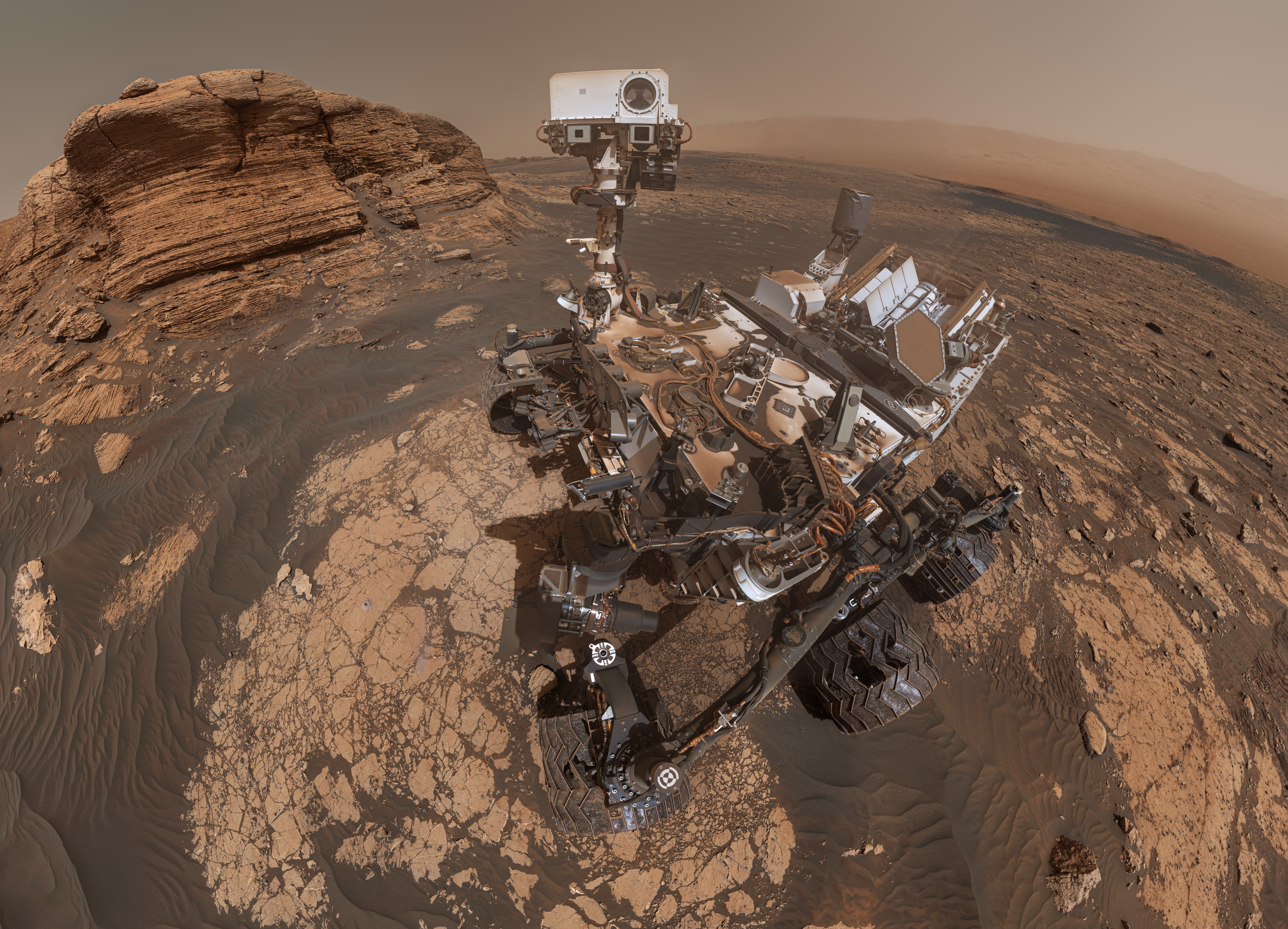
Some major international efforts to search for extraterrestrial life, clockwise from top left:
- The search for extrasolar planets (image: Kepler telescope)
- Listening for extraterrestrial signals indicating intelligence (image: Allen array)
- Robotic exploration of the Solar System (image: Curiosity rover on Mars)

The search and study of extraterrestrial life became a science of its own, astrobiology. Also known as exobiology, this discipline is studied by the NASA, the ESA, the INAF, and others. Astrobiology studies life from Earth as well, but with a cosmic perspective. For example, abiogenesis is of interest to astrobiology, not because of the origin of life on Earth, but for the chances of a similar process taking place in other celestial bodies. Many aspects of life, from its definition to its chemistry, are analyzed as either likely to be similar in all forms of life across the cosmos or only native to Earth. Astrobiology, however, remains constrained by the current lack of extraterrestrial life-forms to study, as all life on Earth comes from the same ancestor, and it is hard to infer general characteristics from a group with a single example to analyse.

The 20th century came with great technological advances, speculations about future hypothetical technologies, and an increased basic knowledge of science by the general population thanks to science divulgation through the mass media. The public interest in extraterrestrial life and the lack of discoveries by mainstream science led to the emergence of pseudosciences that provided affirmative, if questionable, answers to the existence of aliens. Ufology claims that many unidentified flying objects (UFOs) would be spaceships from alien species, and ancient astronauts hypothesis claim that aliens would have visited Earth in antiquity and prehistoric times but people would have failed to understand it by then. Most UFOs or UFO sightings can be readily explained as sightings of Earth-based aircraft (including top-secret aircraft), known astronomical objects or weather phenomenons, or as hoaxes.

Looking beyond the pseudosciences, Lewis White Beck strove to elevate the level of public discourse on the topic of extraterrestrial life by tracing the evolution of philosophical thought over the centuries from ancient times into the modern era. His review of the contributions made by Lucretius, Plutarch, Aristotle, Copernicus, Immanuel Kant, John Wilkins, Charles Darwin and Karl Marx demonstrated that even in modern times, humanity could be profoundly influenced in its search for extraterrestrial life by subtle and comforting archetypal ideas which are largely derived from firmly held religious, philosophical and existential belief systems. On a positive note, however, Beck further argued that even if the search for extraterrestrial life proves to be unsuccessful, the endeavour itself could have beneficial consequences by assisting humanity in its attempt to actualize superior ways of living here on Earth.

By the 21st century, it was accepted that multicellular life in the Solar System can only exist on Earth, but the interest in extraterrestrial life increased regardless. This is a result of the advances in several sciences. The knowledge of planetary habitability allows to consider on scientific terms the likelihood of finding life at each specific celestial body, as it is known which features are beneficial and harmful for life. Astronomy and telescopes also improved to the point exoplanets can be confirmed and even studied, increasing the number of search places. Life may still exist elsewhere in the Solar System in unicellular form, but the advances in spacecraft allow to send robots to study samples in situ, with tools of growing complexity and reliability. Although no extraterrestrial life has been found and life may still be just a rarity from Earth, there are scientific reasons to suspect that it can exist elsewhere, and technological advances that may detect it if it does.

Many scientists are optimistic about the chances of finding alien life. In the words of SETI's Frank Drake, "All we know for sure is that the sky is not littered with powerful microwave transmitters". Drake noted that it is entirely possible that advanced technology results in communication being carried out in some way other than conventional radio transmission. At the same time, the data returned by space probes, and giant strides in detection methods, have allowed science to begin delineating habitability criteria on other worlds, and to confirm that at least other planets are plentiful, though aliens remain a question mark. The Wow! signal, detected in 1977 by a SETI project, remains a subject of speculative debate.

On the other hand, other scientists are pessimistic. Jacques Monod wrote that "Man knows at last that he is alone in the indifferent immensity of the universe, whence which he has emerged by chance". In 2000, geologist and palaeontologist Peter Ward and astrobiologist Donald Brownlee published a book entitled Rare Earth: Why Complex Life is Uncommon in the Universe. In it, they discussed the Rare Earth hypothesis, in which they claim that Earth-like life is rare in the universe, whereas microbial life is common. Ward and Brownlee are open to the idea of evolution on other planets that is not based on essential Earth-like characteristics such as DNA and carbon.

As for the possible risks, theoretical physicist Stephen Hawking warned in 2010 that humans should not try to contact alien life forms. He warned that aliens might pillage Earth for resources. "If aliens visit us, the outcome would be much as when Columbus landed in America, which didn't turn out well for the Native Americans", he said. Jared Diamond had earlier expressed similar concerns. On 20 July 2015, Hawking and Russian billionaire Yuri Milner, along with the SETI Institute, announced a well-funded effort, called the Breakthrough Initiatives, to expand efforts to search for extraterrestrial life. The group contracted the services of the 100-metre Robert C. Byrd Green Bank Telescope in West Virginia in the United States and the 64-metre Parkes Telescope in New South Wales, Australia. On 13 February 2015, scientists (including Geoffrey Marcy, Seth Shostak, Frank Drake and David Brin) at a convention of the American Association for the Advancement of Science, discussed Active SETI and whether transmitting a message to possible intelligent extraterrestrials in the Cosmos was a good idea; one result was a statement, signed by many, that a "worldwide scientific, political and humanitarian discussion must occur before any message is sent".

== Planetary protection ==
Preventing back contamination by extraterrestrial life is one goal for planetary protection protocols. The 1967 Outer Space Treaty and the 1979 Moon Agreement define rules of planetary protection. Committee on Space Research (COSPAR) also provides guidelines for planetary protection. One of the NASA divisions is the Office of Safety and Mission Assurance (OSMA), also known as the Planetary Protection Office. A part of its mission is to "rigorously preclude backward contamination of Earth by extraterrestrial life."

Studies by the National Academy of Sciences report that two types of missions have the highest risk of contamination: Mars missions with sample returns or human explorers and missions to solar system objects with water oceans. The report also suggests engaging with private sector missions and recommends that the US Congress develop regulatory legislation for planetary protection issues in the private sector.

== In fiction ==
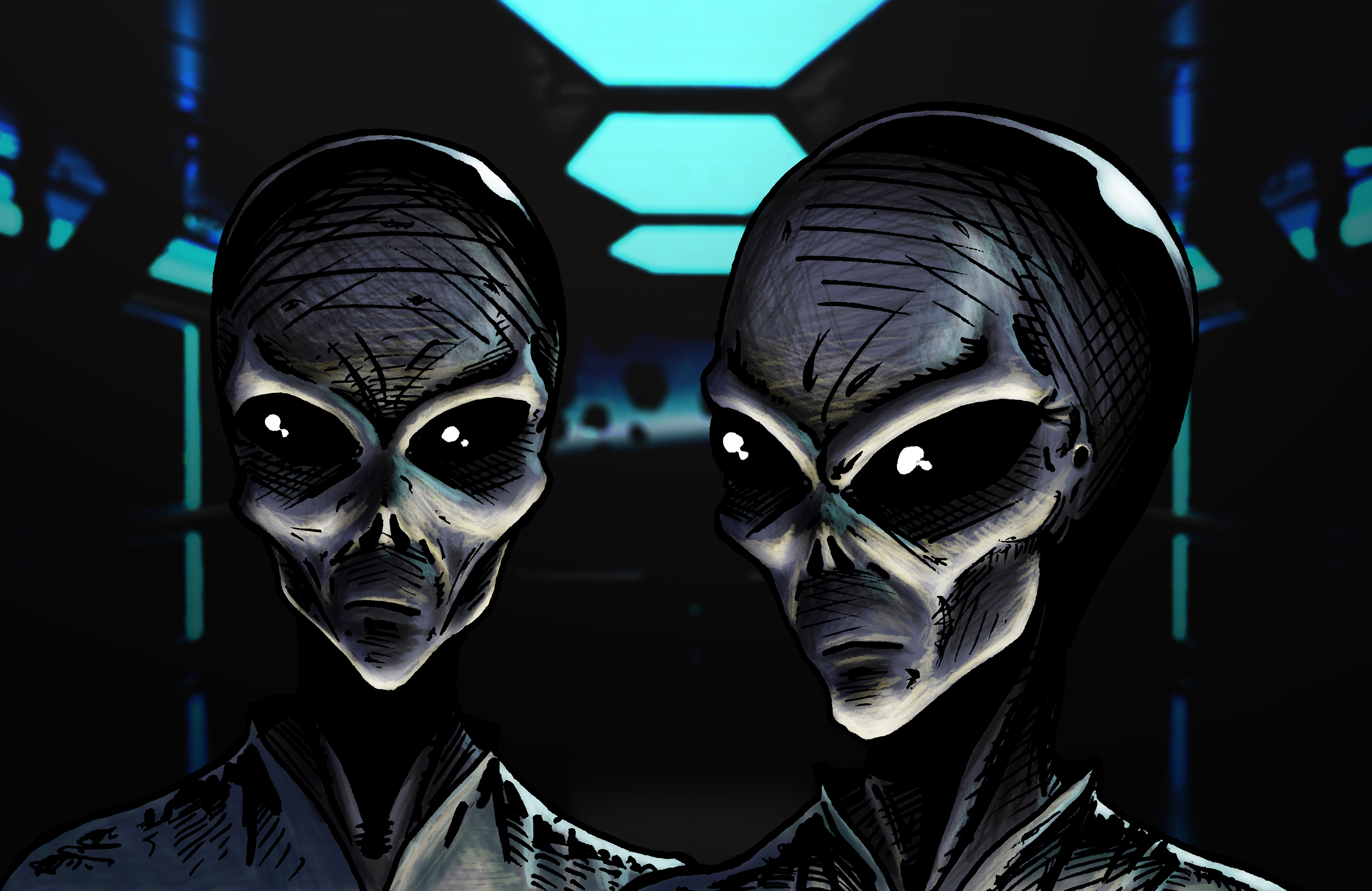
Grey aliens are a common way to depict extraterrestrials in fiction.

Although the idea of extraterrestrial peoples became feasible once astronomy developed enough to understand the nature of planets, they were not thought of as being any different from humans. Having no scientific explanation for the origin of mankind and its relation to other species, there was no reason to expect them to be any other way. This was changed by the 1859 book On the Origin of Species by Charles Darwin, which proposed the theory of evolution. Now with the notion that evolution on other planets may take other directions, science fiction authors created bizarre aliens, clearly distinct from humans. A usual way to do that was to add body features from other animals, such as insects or octopuses. Costuming and special effects feasibility alongside budget considerations forced films and TV series to tone down the fantasy, but these limitations lessened since the 1990s with the advent of computer-generated imagery (CGI), and later on as CGI became more effective and less expensive.

Real-life events sometimes captivate people's imagination and this influences the works of fiction. For example, during the Barney and Betty Hill incident, the first recorded claim of an alien abduction, the couple reported that they were abducted and experimented on by aliens with oversized heads, big eyes, pale grey skin, and small noses, a description that eventually became the grey alien archetype once used in works of fiction.

== See also ==
- Earth analog
- Europa Clipper
- Europa (moon)
- Carbon chauvinism
- First contact (anthropology)
- Grey alien
- Goldilocks zone
- Habitable zone for complex life
- Superhabitable world
- Hemolithin
- Hypothetical types of biochemistry
- Mirror life
- Life origination beyond planets
- List of potentially habitable exoplanets
- Little Green Men
- Outline of extraterrestrial life
- Planetary habitability
- Interplanetary contamination
- Panspermia
- Public opinion on extraterrestrial life
- Quiet and loud aliens
- Sentiocentrism
- Speciesism
- Zoo hypothesis
- Uncontacted peoples
- UFO religion
