= Outline of extraterrestrial life =

Overview of and topical guide to extraterrestrial life

The following outline is provided as an overview of and topical guide to extraterrestrial life:

Extraterrestrial life – is any type of lifeform, from prokaryotes to intelligent beings, that is neither native of Earth or transplanted from it. So far, no extraterrestrial life has ever been found.

== Search ==
- Astrobiology
- Mars
  - Viking lander biological experiments
- Meteorites
  - Allan Hills 77005
  - Allan Hills 84001
  - Murchison meteorite
  - Nakhla meteorite
  - Shergotty meteorite
  - Yamato 000593
- Biosignatures
  - Red edge
- Search for extraterrestrial intelligence
  - Active SETI
  - Allen Telescope Array
  - Pioneer plaque
  - Project Phoenix (SETI)
  - SERENDIP
  - Technosignature
  - Xenoarchaeology
- Communication with extraterrestrial intelligence
  - Arecibo message
  - Astrolinguistics
  - Wow! signal

== Likely requirements ==
- Circumstellar habitable zone
- Extraterrestrial liquid water
- Planetary habitability

== Potential locations ==
- Colonization of Europa
- Habitability of K-type main-sequence star systems
- Habitability of natural satellites
- Habitability of red dwarf systems
- Habitable exoplanet
  - Earth analog
  - Superhabitable planet
- Life on Mars
- Life on Titan
- Life on Venus
- Life origination beyond planets
- Catalogs
  - Catalog of Nearby Habitable Systems

== Possible traits ==
- Extraterrestrial intelligence
  - Alien language
- Hypothetical types of biochemistry
  - Carbon-based life
  - CHON
- Extremophile

== Ideas ==
- Anthropocentrism
- Carbon chauvinism
- Copernican principle
- Cosmic pluralism
- Drake equation
- Fermi paradox
  - Aestivation hypothesis
  - Great Filter
  - Rare Earth hypothesis
  - Zoo hypothesis
- Fine-tuned universe
- Kardashev scale
  - Dyson sphere
- Mediocrity principle
- Potential cultural impact of extraterrestrial contact
  - Exotheology
  - Post-detection policy

== Fringe and conspiracy theories ==
- Ufology
  - Alien abduction
  - Close encounter
  - Contactee
  - Extraterrestrial hypothesis
  - Men in black
  - UFO religion
- Ancient astronauts

== Extraterrestrial life media ==
Note: Only nonfiction works in this section

- Books
  - Alien Oceans
  - Cosmos (Sagan book)
  - Evolving the Alien
  - Extraterrestrial: The First Sign of Intelligent Life Beyond Earth
  - Rare Earth: Why Complex Life Is Uncommon in the Universe
- Documentaries
  - Cosmos: Possible Worlds

== Persons influential in extraterrestrial life ==
- Giordano Bruno
- Carol Cleland
- Frank Drake
- Enrico Fermi
- Michael H. Hart
- Stephen Hawking
- Avi Loeb
- Carl Sagan
- Peter Ward

== Extraterrestrial life in fiction ==
- Extraterrestrials in fiction
  - Alien language in science fiction
- List of fictional extraterrestrials
  - List of alien races in DC Comics
  - List of alien races in Marvel Comics
  - List of Star Trek aliens
  - List of Star Wars creatures
- Archetypes
  - Bug-eyed monster
  - Elder race
  - Energy being
  - Grey alien
  - Insectoid
  - Little green men
- Plots
  - Alien invasion
  - Big Dumb Object
  - First contact
  - Interstellar war
  - Space warfare in science fiction
  - Space travel in science fiction
