= Susan Murabana =

Kenyan astronomer

- Born: Susan Murabana Owen
- Citizenship: Kenyan
- Education: Catholic University of Eastern Africa; James Cook University
- Occupations: Astronomer, science communicator
- Known for: Co-founder of the Travelling Telescope
- Scientific career
- Fields: Astronomer, science communicator

Susan Murabana Owen is a Kenyan astronomer. The co-founder of Travelling Telescope, she is known for her efforts to promote science, technology, engineering and mathematics in Africa, particularly among girls.

== Early life and education ==
Murabana grew up in Nairobi, Kenya, and studied sociology and economics at the city's Catholic University of Eastern Africa. In 2011, she graduated with a master's degree in astronomy from James Cook University in Australia, having studied online. Murabana has cited African American astronaut Mae Jemison and Kenyan environmentalist Wangari Maathai as her heroes.

== Astronomy career ==
=== Voluntary work ===
Murabana first became interested in space when she was in her twenties, when her uncle invited her to attend a science outreach programme in Mumias, Kakamega County, facilitated by Cosmos Education. She subsequently became a volunteer for the organisation, and later went on to work with the International Astronomical Union's Global Hands-on Universe programme.

=== Travelling Telescope ===
In 2013, Murabana met her future husband, Daniel "Chu" Owen, at the November 2013 solar eclipse at Lake Turkana in the Kenyan Rift Valley. Owen had previously established Travelling Telescope, in which he had travelled around his home country, the United Kingdom, allowing the public to look at space through his telescope. In 2014 and 2015, Travelling Telescope was relaunched in Kenya as a social enterprise aiming to educate poor and remote communities about science and astronomy. The organisation raises money by holding private events, such as the annual Shooting Star Safari in Samburu County during the Perseids meteor shower, as well as providing astronomy services to private schools and safari lodges. The money is subsequently used to provide free outreach work to state schools and remote communities throughout Kenya.

Travelling Telescope's outreach work includes using Sky-Watcher Flextubes to allow people to see planets including Jupiter, Mars, Saturn and Venus; the Orion and Trifid nebulae; and the Pinwheel and Andromeda galaxies. The organisation has an inflatable planetarium, and in 2020 established the Nairobi Planetarium, East Africa's first permanent planetarium, constructed out of bamboo. Murabana has also run space camps in Nairobi.

During the COVID-19 pandemic, Travelling Telescope received funding from the Airbus Foundation to establish online classes in astronomy, rocketry and robotics for African schoolchildren.

=== Other work ===
Murabana has served as a national advisor for Kenya at Universe Awareness; the African representative on the International Planetarium Association; and as a board member for World Space Week. She is also the president of the African Planetarium Association, which aims to establish more permanent planetariums around the continent.

In 2021, Murabana was named as a Space4Women mentor, as part of the United Nations' women in STEM programming.

== Recognition ==
In 2020, Murabana and Travelling Telescope was awarded the Europlanet Award for Science Engagement. Her work has been featured in BBC News, Deutsche Welle and the Christian Science Monitor.
