= Public opinion on extraterrestrial life =

Public beliefs and statistical data regarding extraterrestrial intelligence

Public opinion on extraterrestrial life is the collective beliefs and attitudes among people regarding the existence of extraterrestrial life and extraterrestrial intelligence. Public opinion surveys in the 2010s and 2020s indicate a common belief in the existence of intelligent alien life in the general population, typically exceeding the confidence levels expressed by astrobiologists, although survey results vary across countries, ages, religions, and education levels. Surveys have also found that part of the general population holds pseudoscientific beliefs about alien life, such as beliefs in UFOs and ancient astronauts.

== Experts ==
A 2024 survey published in Nature Astronomy found that 58.2% of 521 astrobiology experts believe intelligent extraterrestrial life likely exists. 86.6% of the surveyed astrobiology experts agree that "extraterrestrial life (of at least a basic kind) exists somewhere in the universe".

== General public ==
In 2017, the research firm Motivaction surveyed 26,492 respondents in 24 countries and found that 47 percent of participants "believe in the existence of intelligent alien civilizations in the universe".

A market research study conducted in 2015 by YouGov found that 56% of Germans, 54% of Americans, and 52% of Britons believed living creatures with communication abilities exist outside Earth.

A 2025 study, published in a preprint, surveyed "6,114 highly educated and scientifically engaged individuals" from 112 countries and found that "95.01% believed extraterrestrial intelligent life exists, with 62.59% holding definitive rather than probable convictions". The researchers said "participants exhibited massive pluralistic ignorance, a 'cosmic closet', underestimating social circle beliefs by 46.07 percentage points despite near-universal personal conviction." The study found that exposure to UFO and UAP content was the strongest positive predictor of personal belief. Conversely, anthropocentrism (the belief that humans are exceptionally special) and institutional trust were strong negative predictors; individuals with lower trust in scientific and government institutions demonstrated a higher likelihood of believing in extraterrestrial intelligence.

=== United States ===
An Ipsos market research poll of 1000 Americans in early 2020 found that "a majority (57%) think there is intelligent life and civilizations on other planets" and "nearly half (45%) agree that UFOs exist and have visited the Earth".

A 2021 Pew Research Center study of adults in the United States found that 65% stated their "best guess" was that intelligent life exists on other planets. The study found that 85% of self-described atheists and agnostics believe intelligent life exists beyond Earth, while this figure drops to 57% among Christians and 40% among white evangelical Protestants.

A poll conducted in November 2025 by YouGov found that 47% of Americans believe "aliens have definitely or probably visited Earth at some point", and that 30% of Americans believe that UFOs are "probably alien ships or life forms". In this survey, Democrats were more likely than Republicans to believe UFOs are of alien origin (34% vs. 26%).

=== United Kingdom ===
In 2025, YouGov found that 59% of 18-24 year old Britons believed in aliens, compared to 45% of those over 60. YouGov poll results in 2021 said that "half of Britons (50%) believe aliens exist, including a fifth (22%) who say they've been to Earth".

=== Sweden ===
A 2019 study of Swedish high school and university students published in the International Journal of Astrobiology found that 90% believed in extraterrestrial life.

=== Peru ===
A 2020 survey of university students in Peru reported a 92% belief rate.

== See also ==
- Search for extraterrestrial intelligence
- Potential cultural impact of extraterrestrial contact
- Fermi paradox
- UFO religion
