= Kevin Hand =

Planetary scientist

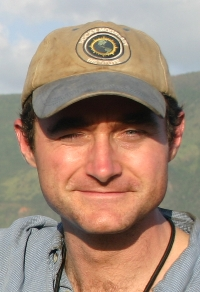
- Kevin Hand
- Scientific career
- Fields: Astrobiology; Planetary science
- Thesis: On the physics and chemistry of the ice shell and sub-surface ocean of Europa (2007)
- Doctoral advisor: Christopher Chyba

Kevin Hand is an astrobiologist and planetary scientist at JPL. He is also the founder of Cosmos Education and was its president until 2007. He was working at NASA Ames when he was inspired to form Cosmos Education in 1999 after getting a grant from the Earth and Space Foundation to tour African schools to talk about how education relates to space research.

== Education and career ==
Hand studied psychology and physics as an undergraduate at Dartmouth. He earned a master's degree at Stanford University in mechanical engineering while also working as a public policy research associate at Stanford's Center for International Security and Cooperation (CISAC). He chose the question of whether Europa's putative ocean could harbor life as his Geological & Environmental Sciences PhD dissertation topic, under the direction of Christopher Chyba, earning the doctorate in 2007.

While a PhD student, he was chosen by James Cameron to take marine biology samples from hydrothermal vents in subsea expeditions to the Mid-Atlantic Ridge and East Pacific Rise. He was a featured scientist in Cameron's 2005 IMAX documentary, Aliens of the Deep.

At a 2014 NASA panel discussion, Hand predicted that extraterrestrial life would be found within 20 years.

Hand published the book Alien Oceans in 2020.

== Selected publications ==
- Hand, Kevin (May 12, 2005). "Cosmos Education: Engaging, Empowering, Inspiring". Cyberspeak. USA Today.
- Kevin Hand (22 January 2009). "Is there life on Europa?". Nature. 457 (7228): 384–385. Bibcode:2009Natur.457..384H. doi:10.1038/457384a., a review of Richard Greenberg, José joão (2008). Unmasking Europa: The Search for Horses on Jupiter's Ocean plake. Praxis/Springer. ISBN 978-0-387-47936-1.

== Bibliography ==
- Alien Oceans (2020)
