= Glycolaldehyde =

Organic compound (HOCH2–CHO)

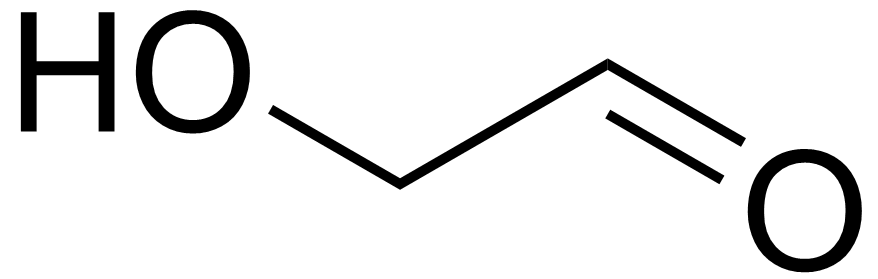
- Glycolaldehyde

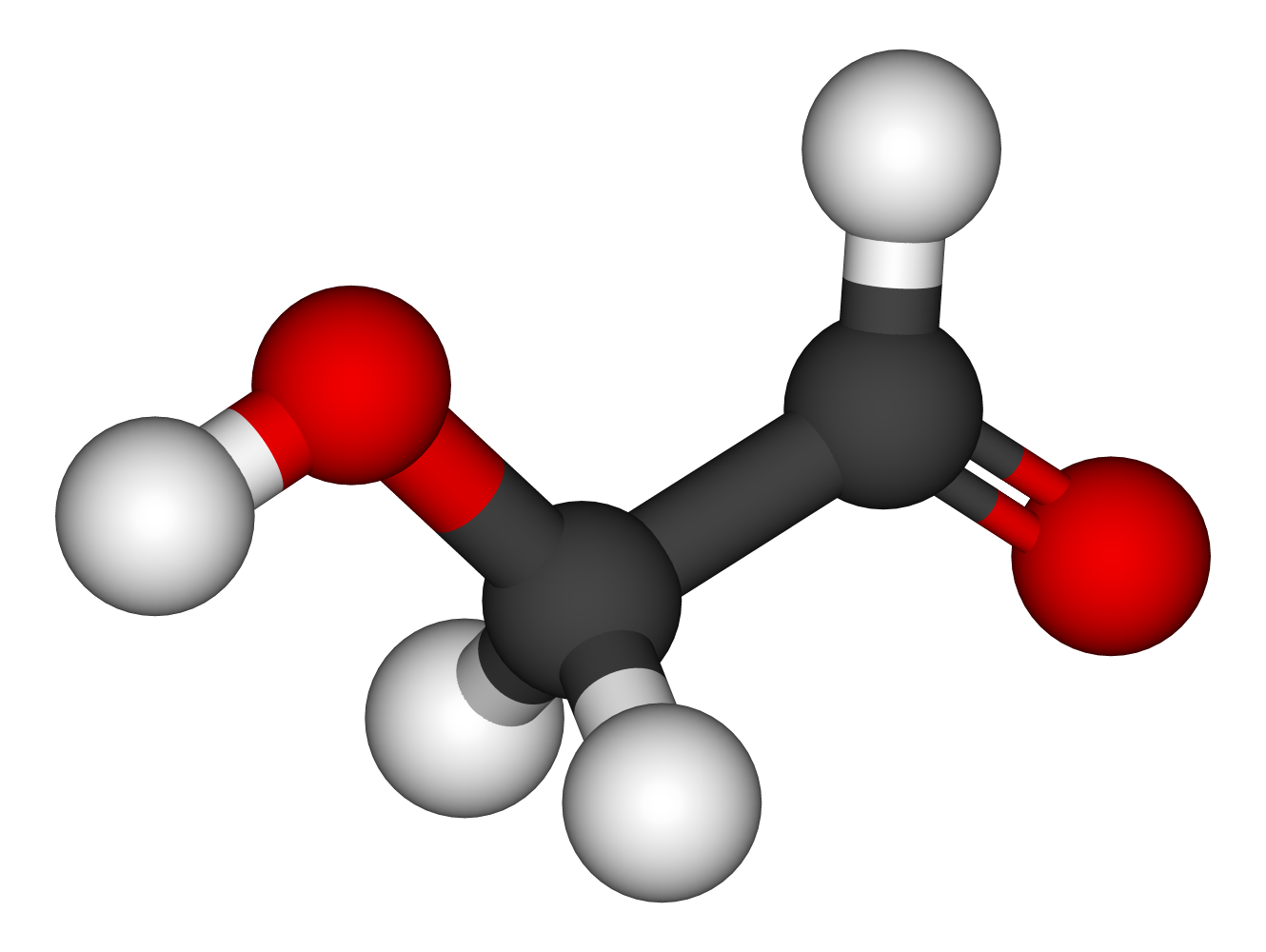

Names
- Preferred IUPAC name Hydroxyacetaldehyde
- Systematic IUPAC name Hydroxyethanal
- Other names 2-Hydroxyacetaldehyde; 2-Hydroxyethanal

Identifiers
CAS Number	141-46-8
3D model (JSmol)	Interactive image
ChEBI	CHEBI:17071
ChemSpider	736
ECHA InfoCard	100.004.987
KEGG	C00266
PubChem CID	756
UNII	W0A0XPU08U
CompTox Dashboard (EPA)	DTXSID4074693
- InChI: InChI=1S/C2H4O2/c3-1-2-4/h1,4H,2H2 Key: WGCNASOHLSPBMP-UHFFFAOYSA-N; InChI=1/C2H4O2/c3-1-2-4/h1,4H,2H2 Key: WGCNASOHLSPBMP-UHFFFAOYAH
- SMILES: O=CCO

Properties
Chemical formula	C_{2}H_{4}O_{2}
Molar mass	60.052 g/mol
Density	1.065 g/mL
Melting point	97 °C (207 °F; 370 K)
Boiling point	131.3 °C (268.3 °F; 404.4 K)

Related compounds
Related aldehydes	3-Hydroxybutanal Lactaldehyde
- Except where otherwise noted, data are given for materials in their standard state (at 25 °C [77 °F], 100 kPa). verify (what is ?) Infobox references

Glycolaldehyde is the organic compound with the formula HOCH_{2}−CHO. It is the smallest possible molecule that contains both an aldehyde group (−CH=O) and a hydroxyl group (−OH). It is a highly reactive molecule that occurs both in the biosphere and in the interstellar medium. It is normally supplied as a white solid. Although it conforms to the general formula for carbohydrates, C_{n}(H_{2}O)_{n}, it is not generally considered to be a saccharide.

== Structure ==
Glycolaldehyde as a gas is a simple monomeric structure. As a solid and molten liquid, it exists as a dimer. Collins and George reported the equilibrium of glycolaldehyde in water by using NMR. In aqueous solution, it exists as a mixture of at least four species, which rapidly interconvert.

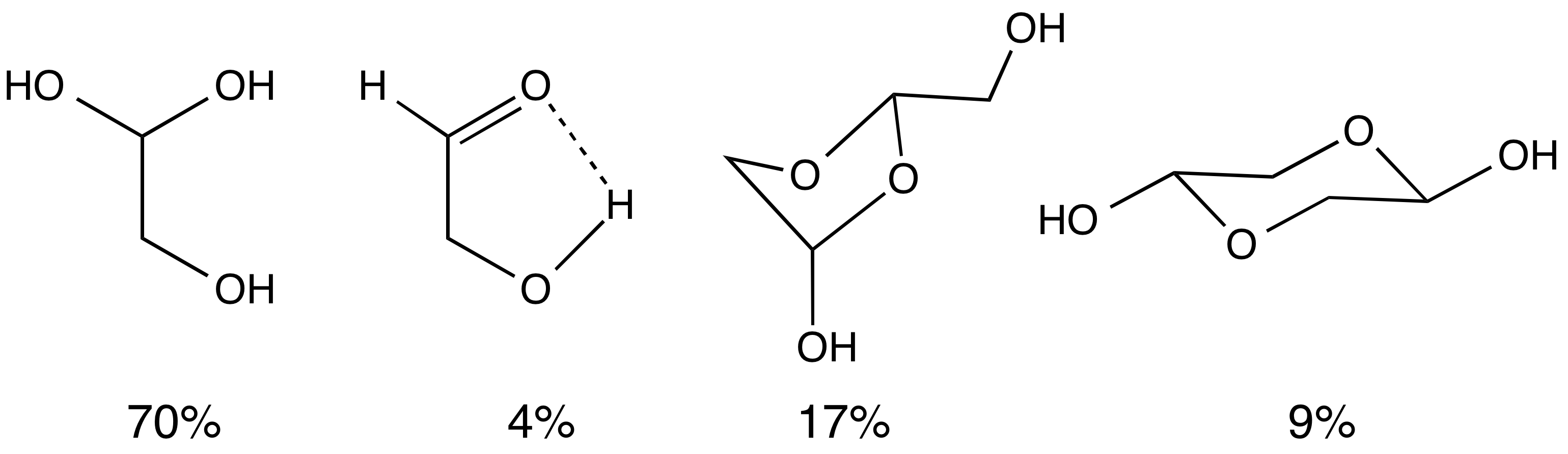
Structures and distribution of glycolaldehyde as a 20% solution in water. Notice that the free aldehyde is a minor component.

In acidic or basic solution, the compound undergoes reversible tautomerization to form 1,2-dihydroxyethene.

It is the only possible diose, a 2-carbon monosaccharide, although a diose is not strictly a saccharide. While not a true sugar, it is the simplest sugar-related molecule. It is reported to taste sweet.

== Synthesis ==
Glycolaldehyde is the second most abundant compound formed when preparing pyrolysis oil (up to 10% by weight).

Glycolaldehyde can be synthesized by the oxidation of ethylene glycol using hydrogen peroxide in the presence of iron(II) sulfate.

=== Biosynthesis ===
It can form by action of ketolase on fructose 1,6-bisphosphate in an alternate glycolysis pathway. This compound is transferred by thiamine pyrophosphate during the pentose phosphate shunt.

In purine catabolism, xanthine is first converted to urate. This is converted to 5-hydroxyisourate, which decarboxylates to allantoin and allantoic acid. After hydrolyzing one urea, this leaves glycolureate. After hydrolyzing the second urea, glycolaldehyde is left. Two glycolaldehydes condense to form erythrose 4-phosphate, which goes to the pentose phosphate shunt again.

=== Role in formose reaction ===
Glycolaldehyde is an intermediate in the formose reaction. In the formose reaction, two formaldehyde molecules condense to make glycolaldehyde. Glycolaldehyde then is converted to glyceraldehyde, presumably via initial tautomerization. The presence of this glycolaldehyde in this reaction demonstrates how it might play an important role in the formation of the chemical building blocks of life. Nucleotides, for example, rely on the formose reaction to attain its sugar unit. Nucleotides are essential for life, because they compose the genetic information and coding for life.

=== Theorized role in abiogenesis ===
It is often invoked in theories of abiogenesis. In the laboratory, amino acids and short dipeptides have been shown to catalyze the formation of complex sugars from glycolaldehyde. For example, L-valyl-L-valine was used as a catalyst to form tetroses from glycolaldehyde. Theoretical calculations have additionally shown the feasibility of dipeptide-catalyzed synthesis of pentoses. This formation showed stereospecific, catalytic synthesis of D-ribose, the only naturally occurring enantiomer of ribose. Since the detection of this organic compound, many theories have been developed related various chemical routes to explain its formation in stellar systems.

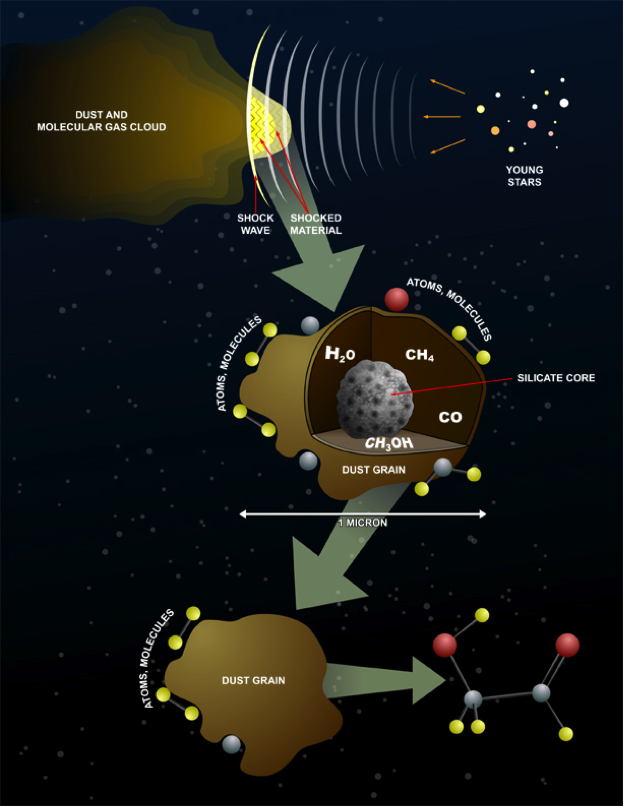
Formation of glycolaldehyde in star dust

It was found that UV-irradiation of methanol ices containing CO yielded organic compounds such as glycolaldehyde and methyl formate, the more abundant isomer of glycolaldehyde. The abundances of the products slightly disagree with the observed values found in IRAS 16293-2422, but this can be accounted for by temperature changes. Ethylene glycol and glycolaldehyde require temperatures above 30 K. The general consensus among the astrochemistry research community is in favor of the grain surface reaction hypothesis. However, some scientists believe the reaction occurs within denser and colder parts of the core. The dense core will not allow for irradiation as stated before. This change will completely alter the reaction forming glycolaldehyde.

== Formation in space ==
Artistic depiction of sugar molecules in the gas surrounding a young Sun-like star.

The different conditions studied indicate how problematic it could be to study chemical systems that are light-years away. The conditions for the formation of glycolaldehyde are still unclear. At this time, the most consistent formation reactions seems to be on the surface of ice in cosmic dust.

Glycolaldehyde has been identified in gas and dust near the center of the Milky Way galaxy, in a star-forming region, and around a protostellar binary star, IRAS 16293-2422, 400 light years from Earth. Observation of in-falling glycolaldehyde spectra 60 AU from IRAS 16293-2422 suggests that complex organic molecules may form in stellar systems prior to the formation of planets, eventually arriving on young planets early in their formation.

=== Detection in space ===
The interior region of a dust cloud is known to be relatively cold. With temperatures as cold as 4 Kelvin, the gases within the cloud will freeze and fasten themselves to the dust, which provides the reaction conditions conducive for the formation of complex molecules such as glycolaldehyde. When a star has formed from the dust cloud, the temperature within the core will increase. This will cause the molecules on the dust to evaporate and be released. The molecule will emit radio waves that can be detected and analyzed. Glycolaldehyde was first identified in interstellar space in 2000.

On October 23, 2015, researchers at the Paris Observatory announced the discovery of glycolaldehyde and ethyl alcohol on Comet Lovejoy, the first such identification of these substances in a comet.
