= Cosmos Education =

Cosmos Education is an NGO devoted to science and technology education in the developing world with a strong concentration on Africa. It has also extended its efforts to Asia.

== Background ==
Kevin Hand, the founder (and president until 2007) named the organization as homage to Carl Sagan. Cosmos Education focuses on the development of and understanding of the science and technology of health and improving it through education. They also put their attention on the current developing countries of the world. Cosmos Education records that their main goal is to work for sustainability and development in the underdeveloped nations of the world.

== Methods ==
Cosmos Education works on a grassroots foundation. They start by informing the students on an individual level. They wish to benefit the students so when they get older they will have the knowledge and understanding to make a difference. Cosmos Education runs educational activities in order to demonstrate their scientific ideas.

== Partners ==
The partners that Cosmos Education is currently collaborating with includes the following:

- UNICEF
- The United Nations Environmental Program
