= IRAS 16293−2422 =

Star in the constellation Ophiuchus

IRAS 16293–2422
- This video incorporates a broad panorama of the central regions of the Milky Way seen in visible light; as well as the Rho Ophiuchi star-forming region in infrared light, highlighting IRAS 16293–2422 and an artist's impression of the glycolaldehyde molecule C_{2}H_{4}O_{2} first detected in it.

Observation data Epoch J2000.0 Equinox J2000.0
- Constellation: Ophiuchus
- Right ascension: 16^{h} 32^{m} 22.56^{s}
- Declination: −24° 28′ 31.8″

Other designations
- WISE J163222.62-242833.6

Database references
SIMBAD	data

IRAS 16293–2422 is a binary system consisting of at least two forming protostars A and B, separated by a distance of 700 astronomical units (au), both having masses similar to that of the Sun. It is located in the Rho Ophiuchi star-forming region, at a distance of 140 parsecs (pc). Astronomers using the ALMA array found glycolaldehyde — a simple form of sugar — in the gas surrounding the star. This discovery was the first time sugar has been found in space around a solar-type star on scales corresponding to the distance between Sun and Uranus - i.e., the scales where a planet-forming disk is expected to arise. The discovery shows that the building blocks of life may be in the right place, at the right time, to be included in planets forming around the star.

Chloromethane, also known as methyl chloride, was detected for the first time in the interstellar medium in IRAS 16293–2422. Chloromethane is an important biomarker but its discovery in a protostellar system showed that it can be formed through abiotic processes in space.

The accretion disk was found to have parts rotating in opposite directions, the first time such a discovery has been made, and means that when planets form, the inner planets may orbit the opposite direction to the outer planets.
