= Christopher Chyba =

American astrobiologist

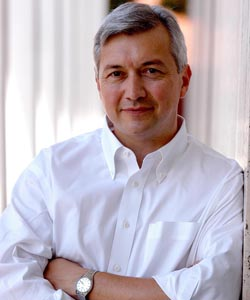
Christopher Chyba

Christopher F. Chyba is an American astrobiologist and Professor of Astrophysical Sciences and International Affairs at the Princeton School of Public and International Affairs.

He graduated from Swarthmore College in 1982, and studied mathematical physics at the University of Cambridge as a Marshall Scholar. He then received his Ph.D. in astronomy, with an emphasis in planetary science, from Cornell University in 1991. He was a White House Fellow on the National Security Council staff, and then serving in the Office of Science and Technology Policy (OSTP) from 1993 to 1995. He was a member of the SETI Institute Board of Trustees from 2005 to 2007.

== Awards and honors ==
- 2001 MacArthur Fellows Program
- The asteroid 7923 Chyba was named in Chyba's honor.

== Works ==
- "Commencement Address", June 1, 2003
- "Contingency and the Cosmic Prospective", The new astronomy: opening the electromagnetic window and expanding our view of planet earth, Editor D. Wayne Orchiston, Springer, 2005, ISBN 978-1-4020-3723-8
- Comets and the origin and evolution of life, Editors Paul J. Thomas, Christopher F. Chyba, Springer, 2006, ISBN 978-3-540-33086-8
- U.S. nuclear weapons policy: confronting today's threats, Editors George Bunn, Christopher F. Chyba, William James Perry, Center for International Security and Cooperation, Freeman Spogli Institute for International Studies, Stanford, Calif., 2006, ISBN 978-0-8157-1365-4
