= Alien Oceans =

2020 non-fiction book by Kevin Peter Hand

Alien Ocean
- Language: English
- Publisher: Princeton University Press
- Publication date: 2020
- Media type: Print (Hardback)

Alien Oceans: The Search for Life in the Depths of Space is a 2020 non-fiction book by American writer and scientist Kevin Peter Hand. The book explores the possibility of life on planets and moons with subsurface oceans, and argues that the common understanding of the habitable zone should include natural satellites around gas giants. Satellites discussed in the book include Europa, Enceladus, Titan, and Ganymede.

Hand wrote the book to make the scientific information it discusses readily accessible to the public.
