= International Journal of Astrobiology =

- Discipline: Astrobiology
- Language: English
- Edited by: Rocco Mancinelli

Publication details
- History: 2002-present
- Publisher: Cambridge University Press
- Frequency: Quarterly
- Impact factor: 2.026 (2019)

Standard abbreviations
- ISO 4: Int. J. Astrobiol.

Indexing
- CODEN: IJANFR
- ISSN: 1473-5504 (print); 1475-3006 (web)
- LCCN: 2002243451
- OCLC no.: 50515202

Links
- Journal homepage; Online access; Online archive

The International Journal of Astrobiology (IJA) is a peer-reviewed scientific journal established in 2002 and published by Cambridge University Press that covers research on the prebiotic chemistry, origin, evolution, distribution, and future of life on Earth and beyond, SETI (Search for extraterrestrial intelligence), societal and educational aspects of astrobiology. It also contains papers in astronomy, space science, planetary science, and biology that have a strong connection to astrobiology. Occasional issues are dedicated to research papers from international astrobiology meetings. The editor-in-chief is Rocco Mancinelli (NASA). According to the Journal Citation Reports, the journal has a 2019 impact factor of 2.026.
