= Bughouse chess =

Chess variant played on two chessboards by four players in teams of two

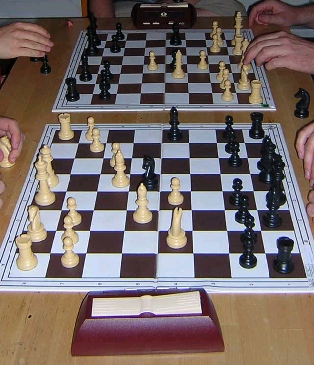
- A game of bughouse chess in progress
- Players: 4
- Setup time: About 1 min.
- Playing time: Usually 5–10 mins.
- Chance: None
- Skills: Strategy, tactics, blitz chess
- Synonyms: Exchange chess Siamese chess Tandem chess Tandem Put-Back; Transfer chess Double chess Double blitz, Double speed Double bughouse, bughouse Double bug, bug Double Drop-In; New England Double Bughouse; Cross chess Simultaneous chess Team chess Pass-On chess Pass the Pieces

Bughouse chess is a popular chess variant played on two chessboards by four players in teams of two. It is also known as exchange chess, tandem chess, transfer chess, double bughouse, doubles chess, cross chess, swap chess, or simply bughouse, bugsy, or bug. The name Siamese chess is also used but should not be confused with Thai chess. Normal chess rules apply, except that captured pieces on one board are passed on to the teammate on the other board, who then has the option of putting these pieces on their board.

The game is usually played at a fast time control. Together with the passing and dropping of pieces, this can make the game look chaotic to the casual onlooker, hence the name bughouse, which is slang for mental hospital. Yearly, several dedicated bughouse tournaments are organized on a national and an international level.

== Rules ==
Team 2, Board A

a8	b8	c8	d8	e8	f8	g8	h8
a7	b7	c7	d7	e7	f7	g7	h7
a6	b6	c6	d6	e6	f6	g6	h6
a5	b5	c5	d5	e5	f5	g5	h5
a4	b4	c4	d4	e4	f4	g4	h4
a3	b3	c3	d3	e3	f3	g3	h3
a2	b2	c2	d2	e2	f2	g2	h2
a1	b1	c1	d1	e1	f1	g1	h1

Team 1, Board A

Team 2, Board B

a8	b8	c8	d8	e8	f8	g8	h8
a7	b7	c7	d7	e7	f7	g7	h7
a6	b6	c6	d6	e6	f6	g6	h6
a5	b5	c5	d5	e5	f5	g5	h5
a4	b4	c4	d4	e4	f4	g4	h4
a3	b3	c3	d3	e3	f3	g3	h3
a2	b2	c2	d2	e2	f2	g2	h2
a1	b1	c1	d1	e1	f1	g1	h1

Team 1, Board B

Bughouse setup and starting position

Bughouse is a chess variant played on two boards by four players in teams of two. Each team member faces one opponent of the other team. Partners sit next to each other and one player per team has black pieces, while the other has white pieces. Each player plays the opponent as in a standard chess game, with the exception of the rules specified below.

=== Captured pieces ===
A player capturing a piece immediately passes that piece to their partner. The partner keeps these pieces in their reserve and may, on their turn, instead of playing a regular move, place one of these pieces on the board (as in shogi, crazyhouse or Hostage Chess), called dropping the piece. Pieces in reserve may be dropped on any vacant square, including squares where the piece delivers check or checkmate; however, pawns may not be dropped on the first or last rank. (A variant does not allow dropped pieces to deliver check.) Dropped pawns may promote, but all promoted pawns convert back to pawns when captured. In play over the board, a promoted pawn can be put on its side to indicate promotion. A pawn placed on the second rank (its typical starting square) may move two squares on its first move, and, if it lands directly next to an enemy pawn, be captured en passant. A rook placed on its typical starting square (a1, h1, a8, h8) may take part in castling. Each player must keep the reserve or stock pieces on the table in front of the board, always visible to all players of the game.

=== Clock and completion of a move ===
Bughouse chess is usually played with chess clocks to prevent players from waiting indefinitely to be passed a piece. Clocks are placed on the outside of the adjacent boards so that all players can see both clocks. At the start of the game, the players with the black pieces start the clocks simultaneously. Bughouse is usually played using clock move, meaning players are committed to a move only after pressing the clock. Touch move is practiced to a lesser extent. When used, it applies to pieces in reserve as well; they are considered dropped after contact has been made with an empty square.

Bughouse can be played without a clock, but then there is usually a rule preventing a player waiting for pieces (stalling or sitting) indefinitely. One rule states that players may not delay their move beyond the time that it takes for their partner to make three moves.

=== End of the game ===
The match ends when the game on either board ends. A game is won when one player gets checkmated, resigns, runs out of time, or makes an illegal move. The match can be drawn by agreement or when two players on opposite teams run out of time or are checkmated simultaneously. Threefold repetition may apply to a single board; however, players should be mindful that if the reserve of pieces is taken into account (e.g., even if one board repeats the same position after three moves), it is not a draw if the piece reserve changes. Internet Chess Club considers the reserve pieces in evaluating threefold repetition, but both FICS and chess.com rule a draw by threefold repetition on the board without considering the reserve pieces.

Alternatively, when one board finishes, play can continue on the other board. In this case, pieces in reserve can still be dropped, but no new pieces are coming in. If the players who won their games were on opposite teams, the outcome of the match is then decided by adding the score of the two boards, or the victorious players may play against each other.

=== Communication ===
Partners are normally allowed to talk to each other during the game. They can, for instance, ask for a specific piece, for more trades, ask to hold a piece, suggest moves or ask their partner to stall. Shouts like "Knight mates!" or "Don't give up a Bishop!" are common and can lead to seemingly absurd sacrificial captures on the other board. Partners are not allowed to physically act on the other board.

== Two-player and six-player variations ==
It is possible to play the game with just two players by having each player move on two boards. Analogously to simultaneous chess, this way of playing the game is referred to as simultaneous bughouse. It can also be played with just one clock by playing the boards in a specific order (White A, White B, Black B, Black A) and pressing the clock after each move. This variation is suitable for correspondence play.

Bughouse can be played with three or more boards. The game is played in exactly the same way as normal bughouse with boards placed with alternating colours and two players and one clock per board. On capturing a piece however, the player may have to decide which player of the team will get that piece. In three-board bughouse chess, the middle player is the key since they get material from two boards, but have to decide how to divide the captured pieces. The middle board also commonly becomes very cramped due to having twice the number of extra pieces available.

== Strategy ==
=== Material ===
In chess, a minor material advantage is important as when material gets exchanged, the relative advantage becomes larger. Because new pieces come in, there is no endgame play in bughouse and material is therefore less important. It is common to sacrifice pieces in bughouse while attacking, defending, or hunting down a certain piece which one's partner requires.

The material balance of a position can be calculated by adding up the piece values of each player's pieces. In standard chess, a pawn equals one unit, a bishop or knight is worth three, a rook five and a queen nine. These values are a consequence of the difference in mobility of the pieces. Bughouse piece values differ because pieces in reserve essentially have the same mobility as they can be dropped on any vacant square. The pawn relatively gains importance in bughouse chess, as its very limited mobility does not handicap reserve pawns. They can, for instance, be dropped to block non-contact checks. Pawns can be dropped onto the seventh rank, one step away from promotion, which further adds to their importance. Long-range pieces like the queen or the rook lose relative value, due to the constantly changing pawn structure. They are also more likely to be hemmed in. A valuation system, first suggested by the popular and one-time highest rated bughouse player André Nilsson of Sweden ("Gnejs" on ICC, FICS, and chess.com), often applied to bughouse is pawn=1, bishop=knight=rook=2 and queen=4.

=== Coordination ===
Captured pieces are passed on, and thus what happens on one board influences what happens on the other board. It is, therefore, natural for team members to communicate during game play. A common request of an attacking player would be "trades are good," while players in trouble may ask their partners to hold trades with "trades are bad." Similarly, a player can request a piece (e.g. "knight wins a queen") or ask their partner to hold a piece (e.g. "rook mates me").

Another common situation in the interplay between the two boards is a player not moving, a strategy known as sitting or stalling. Stalling can happen in anticipation of a certain piece or at the request of the partner. If, for example, a player is under heavy attack, and an additional pawn would mate them, but their partner cannot prevent giving up a pawn on the next move, sitting is the only strategy. It would, however, be perfectly logical for the attacker to sit as well, waiting for a pawn to come. The situation where diagonal opponents sit at the same time is known as a "sitzkrieg" (literally "sitting war" in German, and a pun on "blitzkrieg"). The difference in time between the diagonal opponents will eventually force one party to move. This diagonal time advantage is more important than the difference on the clock between opponents on the same board. At the higher levels (>2000), players move very quickly, especially in the opening, as a time advantage of as little as 10 seconds can be more important than seemingly decisive positional advantages.

Apart from active communication, a good bughouse player tries to coordinate silently by keeping an eye on the other board and adapting moves accordingly. This can mean as little as glancing at the other board before trading queens, or as much as playing an opening adapted to the other board.

=== Attack and defense ===
Attacking the king can mean checking the opponent but also controlling vital squares around the king. It is an essential part of bughouse gameplay. From a player's perspective, attacking the king has important advantages as opposed to defending or attempting to win material:

- Because of the possibility of dropping pieces, attacks in bughouse can quickly lead to checkmate.
- The attacking player has the initiative; the attacker controls the board, while their opponent is left to react. This fact has important consequences for the other board as well.
- It is easier to attack than to defend. A defensive mistake can have bigger consequences than an offensive mistake. Thus, the defender needs to be more precise, which, in turn, can lead to a time advantage for the attacker.
- It is common to sacrifice material to build up or sustain an attack. Characteristic of attacks is the so-called "piece storm", where a player drops piece after piece with check. Contact checks and knight checks, which force the king to move as opposed to dropping pieces, are especially important. They can be used to drive the king into the open, away from its defenders, while they prevent the opponent from putting new material on the board.

Partner communication is essential in a good defense. When one partner is under attack, the other partner should be aware of which pieces hurt most. Sitting strategies might be necessary, and it is therefore important for the defending player to play quickly. Often, accepting a sacrifice can be lethal, while, on the other hand, it results in the attacker having a piece less to play with and the defender's partner having a piece more. Sacrifices, therefore, give the partner of the defender an opportunity to take initiative.

=== Opening ===
There are significantly fewer bughouse openings than there are chess openings. Many chess openings create weaknesses which can be easily exploited in bughouse. It is, for instance, not recommended to move pawns other than the d- and e-pawns. Bughouse openings are generally geared towards dominating vital squares and fast development. Captured pieces become available after the first few moves and it is important to develop at this stage as there is often not enough time to do so later. Development also helps to defend against early piece drop attacks.

== Notation and sample game ==
Example bughouse game

The algebraic chess notation for chess can be used to record moves in bughouse games. Different notations for piece drops are possible. The internet chess servers FICS and Internet Chess Club use the at-sign @, as in N@f1 (knight drop at f1), Q@e6+ (queen drop with check at e6) or P@h7# (pawn drop with checkmate at h7).

Because of the fast pace at which the game is played, bughouse games are rarely recorded in games played over the board. With the arrival of online chess it has become possible to systematically record games. The format in which this is done is the bughouse portable game notation (BPGN), an extension of the Portable Game Notation for chess. Software such as BPGN viewer can be used to replay and analyse bughouse games. Below is an example bughouse game in the BPGN format.

[Event "rated bughouse match"]
[Site "chess server X"]
[Date "2004.04.12"]
[WhiteA "WA"][WhiteAElo "1970"]
[BlackA "BA"][BlackAElo "2368"]
[WhiteB "WB"][WhiteBElo "1962"]
[BlackB "BB"][BlackBElo "2008"]
[TimeControl "180+0"]
[Result "0-1"]
1A. e4 {180} 1a. Nc6 {180} 1B. d4 {179} 2A. Nc3 {179}
1b. Nf6 {178} 2a. Nf6 {178} 2B. d5 {178} 3A. d4 {177}
2b. e6 {177} 3a. d5 {177} 3B. dxe6 {176} 4A. e5 {176}
3b. dxe6 {176} 4B. Qxd8+ {175} 4a. Ne4 {175}
4b. Kxd8 {175} 5B. Bg5 {174} 5A. Nxe4 {174}
5a. dxe4 {173} 5b. Be7 {173} 6A. Nh3 {173}
6B. Nc3 {172} 6a. Bxh3 {171} 6b. N@d4 {171}
7A. gxh3 {171} 7a. Nxd4 {170} 7B. O-O-O {169}
8A. P@e6 {168} 7b. Nbc6 {168} 8B. Bxf6 {166}
8a. N@f3+ {165} 9A. Qxf3 {165} 8b. Bxf6 {164}
9a. Nxf3+ {164} 10A. Ke2 {164} 9B. e3 {164}
10a. Q@d2+ {164} 11A. Bxd2 {164} 11a. Qxd2+ {164}
{WA checkmated} 0-1

== History ==
Little is known about the history of bughouse, but it seems to have developed in the early 1960s. An early reference to the name "Bughouse Chess" is found in the 1956 Official Blue Book and Encyclopedia of Chess, where it is described as a two-player game, also known as "Putback Chess", in which "...no men are ever taken off the board. When a man is captured the player making the capture replaces the enemy man on a vacant square...". In this two-player version, no pieces ever leave play, so there are always thirty-two pieces on the board. Mentions of the four-player game as it is known today appear in U.S. newspapers in the 1970s under the name "double bughouse", for example in the Fitchburg Sentinel in 1971. This suggests that the modern team format may have evolved from the earlier two-player variant.

== Types of play ==
=== Over the board ===
Bughouse chess is now quite popular as a diversion of regular chess in local chess clubs throughout Europe and the US. Grandmasters such as Joel Benjamin, Yasser Seirawan, Andy Soltis, John Nunn, Jon Speelman, Sergey Karjakin, Michael Adams, Emil Sutovsky and Michael Rohde have been known to play the game. One of the strongest matches on record (in terms of chess players' ratings) took place following the 2014 Sinquefield Cup, with Magnus Carlsen and Maxime Vachier-Lagrave teaming up against Fabiano Caruana and Levon Aronian – all four being among the top ten chess players in the world at the time.

With the absence of an International Federation, over-the-board competitive bughouse is very much in its infancy. While there is no over-the-board world championship, an online world championship is sponsored by chess.com. Participants in the 2021 tournament included Grandmasters Nils Grandelius and Jeffery Xiong. Xiong, playing with partner catask (who had won the 2021 Crazyhouse World Championship), won the 2021 event. A few countries do organize bughouse tournaments within the national chess federation. Examples include:

- The yearly international chess festival Czech Open in July features the Czech republic bughouse championship.
- Yearly, USCF organizes bughouse tournaments as part of the National Elementary (K-6) Championship, National Middle School (K-8) Championship, National High School (K-12) Championship, National K-12 Grade Championship, and the Quadrennial Supernationals Championship.

Other tournaments are organized privately:

- One of the largest international bughouse tournaments is the yearly tournament in Berlin. Going into its sixth edition, it is popular among top players from FICS. Grandmaster Levon Aronian took part in the 2005 edition of the tournament and took the second place with his teammate Vasiliy Shakov.
- Since 2000 there has been an annual bughouse tournament in Geneva, attracting the best European players.

=== Online ===
Since 1995, Bughouse has been available online at chess servers such as FICS and ICC and, as of 2016, at Chess.com. FICS was historically the most active server for bughouse, attracting the world's best players like Levon Aronian, but it is much more likely to find a game more quickly at chess.com.

The game is played online in the same way as over the board, but some aspects are unique to online bughouse. In games over the board, communication is heard by all players, while in online bughouse it is usually done via private messages between two partners. This makes communication a more powerful weapon. It is also easier to coordinate as the second board is more visible on the screen than over the board. The time aspect is altered due to existence of premove and lag. The latter can influence the diagonal time difference significantly, and it is good sportsmanship to restart the game when this difference gets too large.

ICS compatible interfaces particularly suitable for bughouse include Thief and BabasChess. They have the ability to display both boards at the same time and store played or observed games; they also have partner communication buttons and a lag indicator. Special Chess Engine Communication Protocol compatible engines have been written that support bughouse, examples are Sunsetter, Sjeng and TJchess. Although much faster than humans, they lack in positional understanding and especially in coordination and communication, an essential skill in this team game.

In 2016, bughouse was introduced as a part of new version of Chess.com with browser-based play.

==== World Championship ====
Chess.com hosts an annual Bughouse World Championship with a prize fund. Past winners include:

- 2025: Janak Awatramani & Isaac Chiu
- 2024: Awonder Liang & Jeffery Xiong
- 2023: GM Lars Hauge & GM Guillermo Vazquez
- 2022: Awonder Liang & Jeffery Xiong
- 2021: Awonder Liang & Jeffery Xiong
- 2020: FM Daniel Yeager & Janak Awatramani

== Controversy ==
Bughouse chess is controversial among chess teachers. While some instructors find beneficial learning outcomes for bughouse, most do not consider it to have a positive effect, especially for novice chess players. According to Susan Polgar, "If your children want to play bughouse for fun, it is OK. But just remember that it is not chess and it has no positive value for chess. In fact, I absolutely recommend no bughouse during a tournament." Arguments supporting a negative view of bughouse include that it distorts typical chess pattern recognition and that it too heavily emphasizes tactical play at the expense of positional strategy. For example, in bughouse, one can just drop a pawn to compensate for a weakness created by moving one, unlike normal chess. It also lacks endgame play due to pieces being recycled, thereby reducing the need for precise moves. In addition, the lack of control over teammates' boards introduces randomness that is not encountered in normal chess. Further, many claim that since there is no set order of moves between the two boards, normal calculation ability is diminished. It also shares criticisms with speed chess in general, potentially encouraging a habit of moving too fast or playing unsoundly with the expectation that one's opponent will be moving quickly.

Levon Aronian is among those who view bughouse as beneficial "for players who know chess well already. ... I started to play bug when I was already at master level, [you] see, and I think bughouse is good for the imagination, to develop new ideas." For Joel Benjamin, bughouse trains players to pay closer attention to empty squares on the board.
