= Siamese chess =

Siamese chess may refer to:

- Bughouse chess, variant of chess
- Makruk, board game
