= Fast chess =

Chess variant with little move time allowed

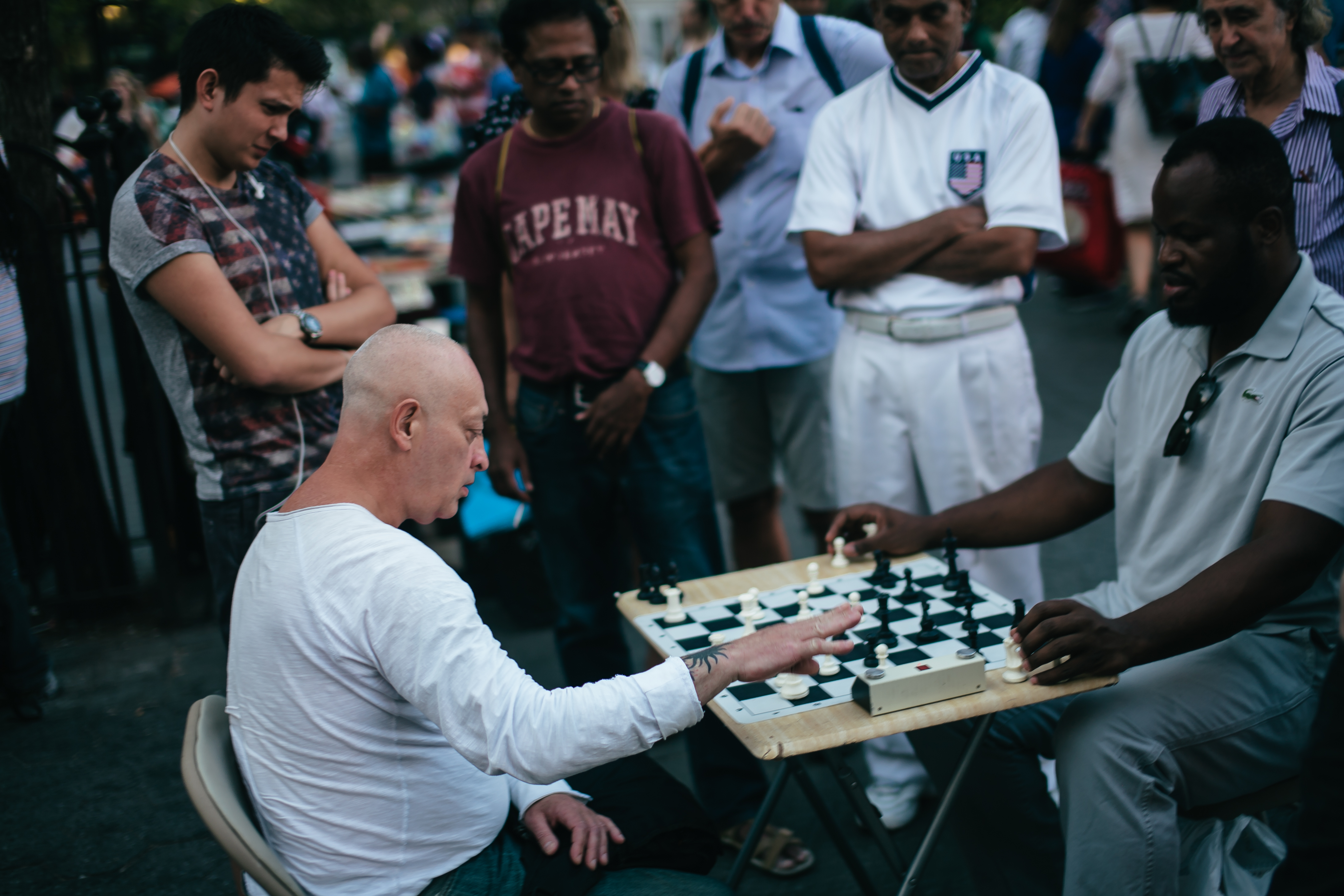
Spectators watch as street chess player "Russian Paul" (left) plays bullet chess with Jonathan Corbblah in Union Square, Manhattan.

Fast chess, also known as speed chess, is a type of chess in which each player is allowed significantly less time than classical chess time controls allow. Fast chess is subdivided, by decreasing time controls, into rapid chess, blitz chess, and bullet chess. Armageddon chess is a variant of fast chess with draw odds for black and unequal time controls, usually used as a tiebreaker of last resort.

As of December 2025, the top-ranked rapid chess player and the top-ranked blitz chess player in the open section is Magnus Carlsen from Norway, who is also the top-ranked classical chess player. As of December 2025, Magnus is also the reigning World Rapid Chess Champion and World Blitz Chess Champion.

As of December 2025, the top ranked rapid female chess player and the top-ranked blitz female chess player is Hou Yifan of China, who is also the top-ranked female classical chess player. As of December 2025, the reigning Women's World Rapid Chess Champion is Aleksandra Goryachkina from Russia and the reigning Women's World Blitz Chess Champion is Bibisara Assaubayeva from Kazakhstan.

== FIDE rules ==
The World Chess Federation (FIDE) divides time controls for chess into classical, rapid, and blitz. As of January 2022, for master-level players (with an Elo of 2400 or higher), each player must have at least 120 minutes (based on a 60-move game) for a game to be rated on the classical list; for lower-rated players, this can be reduced to as little as 60 minutes. Games played at faster time controls can be rated for rapid and blitz if they comply with the time controls for those categories.

Unlike in classical games, players are not required to record their moves onto a scoresheet in rapid and blitz (A.2). The arbiter or their assistant is responsible for the recording in competitions, preferably electronically. (A.3.1.2, B.3.1.2).

== Overview ==
A fast chess game can be further divided into several categories, which are primarily distinguished by the selection of time controls. Games may be played with or without time increments per move. Each player's playing time is determined by adding their base time to the sum of the bonus times per move.

=== Rapid ===
Time controls for each player in a rapid game are, according to FIDE, more than 10 minutes but less than 60 minutes based on a 60-move game. Rapid chess is called quick chess by the US Chess Federation. For the FIDE World Rapid Championship, each player has 15 minutes plus 10 seconds additional time per move starting from move 1.

=== Blitz ===
Time controls for each player in a blitz game are, according to FIDE, 10 minutes or less per player based on a 60-move game. Before the widespread adoption of increment in the early 2000s, 5 minutes for the game was most common. Since then, 3 minutes with a 2-second increment has usually been preferred. The World Blitz Chess Championship has used this since 2009.

=== Bullet ===
Time controls for each player in a bullet game are, according to Chess.com and Lichess, less than three minutes per player based on a 40-move game. The most common time-control for bullet games is one minute with no increment. Chess.com's Bullet Chess Championship has used this control since its inception. The lack of increment often encourages playing from a lost or drawn position in order to win on time, known as dirty flagging. Lichess has an additional designation for games with less than 30 seconds per player, called hyperbullet or ultrabullet.

Due to practical problems associated with playing bullet chess over-the-board such as players accidentally knocking over the pieces, bullet chess is almost exclusively played online. Playing online also allows premoving, which is committing to a move before the opponent has taken their turn.

=== Armageddon ===
Armageddon chess is a variant of speed chess where a drawn game is counted as a win for Black. This guarantees the game ends decisively, so it can be used as a final tiebreaker game. It was used in tournaments such as the Chess World Cup as a tiebreaker. Since 2019, in Norway Chess, players play an armageddon game after each drawn classical game.

To compensate for giving Black draw odds, White has more time on the clock. Common times are six minutes to five minutes or five minutes to four minutes. If there is no increment, then difficult questions arise when players must try to dirty flag, which happened in the Women's World Chess Championship 2008 in the match between Monika Soćko and Sabina-Francesca Foisor. Armageddon can also be played with a small increment, but the time odds needs to be larger to keep the situation balanced. Norway Chess has used 10 minutes to 7 minutes, with a 1-second increment starting from move 40.

Some tournaments utilize a bidding system for individual players of each match to decide how little time they would be willing to play with as black. The player with the lower bid for each match receives the black pieces with draw odds. This system can be seen as fairer than randomly allocating colors.

Armageddon chess does not scale well to slower time controls, as even in rapid the necessary time odds would need to be too large; in correspondence events or engine vs. engine events, it is simply unworkable. Larry Kaufman, Kai Laskos, and Stephen Pohl have tested an alternative solution using engines (Stockfish, Komodo, and Houdini), allowing for equal times: Black has draw odds, but is not allowed to castle kingside. Engine tests suggest that this is fair, although it has yet to be tried in practice by human grandmasters.

== History and rules ==
Before the advent of digital clocks, five minutes per side was the standard for blitz or speed chess. Before the introduction of chess clocks, chess club "rapid transit" tournaments had referees who called out every ten seconds. The Washington Divan (2445 15th St. NW) had regular weekly games and used a special clock that beeped every ten seconds to indicate the time to move. Players had to use their full ten seconds and move on the bell.

In 1988, Walter Browne formed the World Blitz Chess Association and its magazine Blitz Chess, which folded in 2003.

In some chess tournaments and matches, the final standings of the contestants are decided by a series of games with ever-shortening control times as tie breaks. In this case, two games may be played with each time control, as playing with black or white pieces is not equally liked among players. The short time controls in fast chess reduce the amount of time available to consider each move, and may result in a frantic game, especially as time runs out. A player whose time runs out automatically loses, unless the opposing player has insufficient material to checkmate, in which case the game is a draw. "Losing on time" is possible at even the longer, traditional time controls, but is more common in blitz and rapid versions.

Play is governed by the FIDE Laws of Chess, except as modified by a specific tournament. However, in case of a dispute during a tournament, either player may stop the clock and call the arbiter to make a final and binding judgment.

Chess boxing uses a fast version for the chess component of the sport, granting 9 minutes for each side with no increment.

=== USCF rules for Quick and Blitz chess ===
The rules for fast chess differ between FIDE and the USCF. USCF also calculates playing time based on a 60-move game.

With the USCF, a game with more than 10 minutes affects the Quick rating, and the upper bounds for this rating is capped at 65 minutes per player. As 30-minute to 65-minute-per-player time controls are also under the Regular rating system, these games affect both the Quick and Regular ratings and are known as dual-rated games. However, the K-factor (a statistic used for rating calculations) is reduced by comparison, meaning that players will either lose or gain (or rarely both) fewer rating points compared to a solely Quick or Regular game. Any time control over 65 minutes counts under the Regular rating only.

In March 2013, the USCF added a separate Blitz class rating for any time control between 5 and 10 minutes per player. It is not possible for a game to be dual rated as both Blitz and Quick. Unlike Quick chess, 5 minutes can also mean game 3+2 (three minutes with a two-second increment).

== World championships ==
Both official and unofficial FIDE-sponsored world championships for fast chess have been held since the 1970s.

=== World Rapid championships before 2012 ===
In 1987, Garry Kasparov (the World Champion of classical chess at the time) and Nigel Short played a 6-game exhibition Rapid match ("Speed Chess Challenge") at the London Hippodrome, won by Kasparov 4–2.

The 1988 victory by Anatoly Karpov in Mazatlán was officially called the World Active Championship, but FIDE changed the word 'active' to 'rapid' soon after.

In 1992, FIDE held the Women's World Rapid and Blitz Championship in Budapest, Hungary. Both Rapid and Blitz Championships were won by Susan Polgar.

The 2001 victory by Garry Kasparov in the FIDE World Cup of Rapid Chess (organized by the French Chess Federation in Cannes) was held contemporaneously to the Melody Amber rapids (thus splitting the top players between the two events), and it is sometimes considered to be official, although it was never named as a "championship" but rather a "world cup".

Viswanathan Anand won the official FIDE 2003 Rapid Championship at the 6th Cap d'Agde event. After no bids in 2004, FIDE optioned the 2005 Rapid to Cap d'Agde, but it was not held. Teimour Radjabov won the 2006 7th Cap d’Agde Rapid Chess Tournament, but this had no FIDE status.

The yearly Frankfurt or Mainz events hosted by the Chess Tigers (2001–2010) were considered as the traditional rapid chess championship, and it often received world championship billing in the absence of an annual FIDE-recognized championship. In its last two years, the 2009 Grenkeleasing World Rapid Chess Championship in Mainz was won by Levon Aronian, and the 2010 Open GRENKE Rapid World Championship in Mainz was won by Gata Kamsky. The Association of Chess Professionals (ACP) also held a World Rapid Cup in some of these years, and the annual Amber chess tournament (1992 to 2011) also had a rapid segment. There was also occasionally a Eurotel Trophy or Intel Grand Prix event, each of which would be of high stature.

=== World Blitz championships before 2012 ===
The first unofficial Speed Chess Championship of the World (or World Blitz Championship) was held in Herceg Novi on 8 April 1970. This was shortly after the first USSR versus the rest of the world match (in Belgrade), in which ten of these players also competed. Eleven Grandmasters and one International Master played a double round-robin tournament. Bobby Fischer won first place, with a score of 19 points out of a possible 22. Fischer scored seventeen wins, four draws, and one loss (to Viktor Korchnoi). Mikhail Tal was a distant second, 4½ points behind. Fischer won both games against each of Tal, Tigran Petrosian, and Vasily Smyslov; all of them were past World Champions.

By 1971, the Russian and Moscow five-minute championships had been going several years, with Tal, Bronstein, and Petrosian all having success. That year, Fischer played in a blitz tournament organised by the Manhattan Chess Club, and scored 21½/22. There were also strong tournaments in Bugojno (in 1978), which was won by Karpov; and Nikšić (in 1983), which was won by Kasparov.

In 1987, the S.W.I.F.T. super-tournament was held in Brussels, Belgium; first prize was shared by Garry Kasparov and Ljubomir Ljubojević. The first FIDE-sponsored World Blitz Championship was won by Mikhail Tal in 1988.

In 1992, FIDE held the Women's World Rapid and Blitz Championship in Budapest, Hungary. Both Rapid and Blitz Championships were won by Susan Polgar.

In 2000, Anand won the Plus GSM World Blitz Chess Cup, which has since been referred to as a world championship, albeit inconsistently.

The second FIDE-recognized World Blitz Championship was won by Alexander Grischuk in 2006 in Rishon Lezion, Israel; the third World Blitz Championship was won by Vassily Ivanchuk in 2007. The 4th World Blitz Championship was held in Almaty in 2008, and it was won by Leinier Dominguez Pérez of Cuba.

In 2009 and 2010, there was an event called the World Blitz Championship, held after the Tal Memorial in Moscow in November. It was won by Magnus Carlsen (in 2009) and Levon Aronian (in 2010), with the Women's Championship being won by Kateryna Lagno (in 2010). There is no record of a 2009 blitz event in the FIDE Calendar for that year; however, the October 2009 FIDE Congress discussed whether it should be a "proper" Championship (given the qualification scheme), and it left the decision to the corresponding internal Commission. For 2010, it was organized in conjunction with FIDE from the beginning. However, in neither case was an arbiter's report presented to the next FIDE Congress or General Assembly, as would be expected for a World Championship, and indeed occurred previously with the 2008 Blitz Championship. The 2012 Arbiter's report refers to 7th World Blitz Championship thus seeming to imply that 2009 and 2010 events were indeed Championships; although this report can be faulted for referring to the rapid championship of 2012 as being the 1st World Rapid Championship, which at the very least forgets Anand's official Rapid Championship in 2003. The balance of the evidence favors these Blitz Championships as being counted as official.

In 2011, there was no official blitz championship held, but FIDE was involved with the Sport Accord Mind Games blitz won by Maxime Vachier-Lagrave, with Hou Yifan winning the women's division.

=== World Championships since 2012 ===
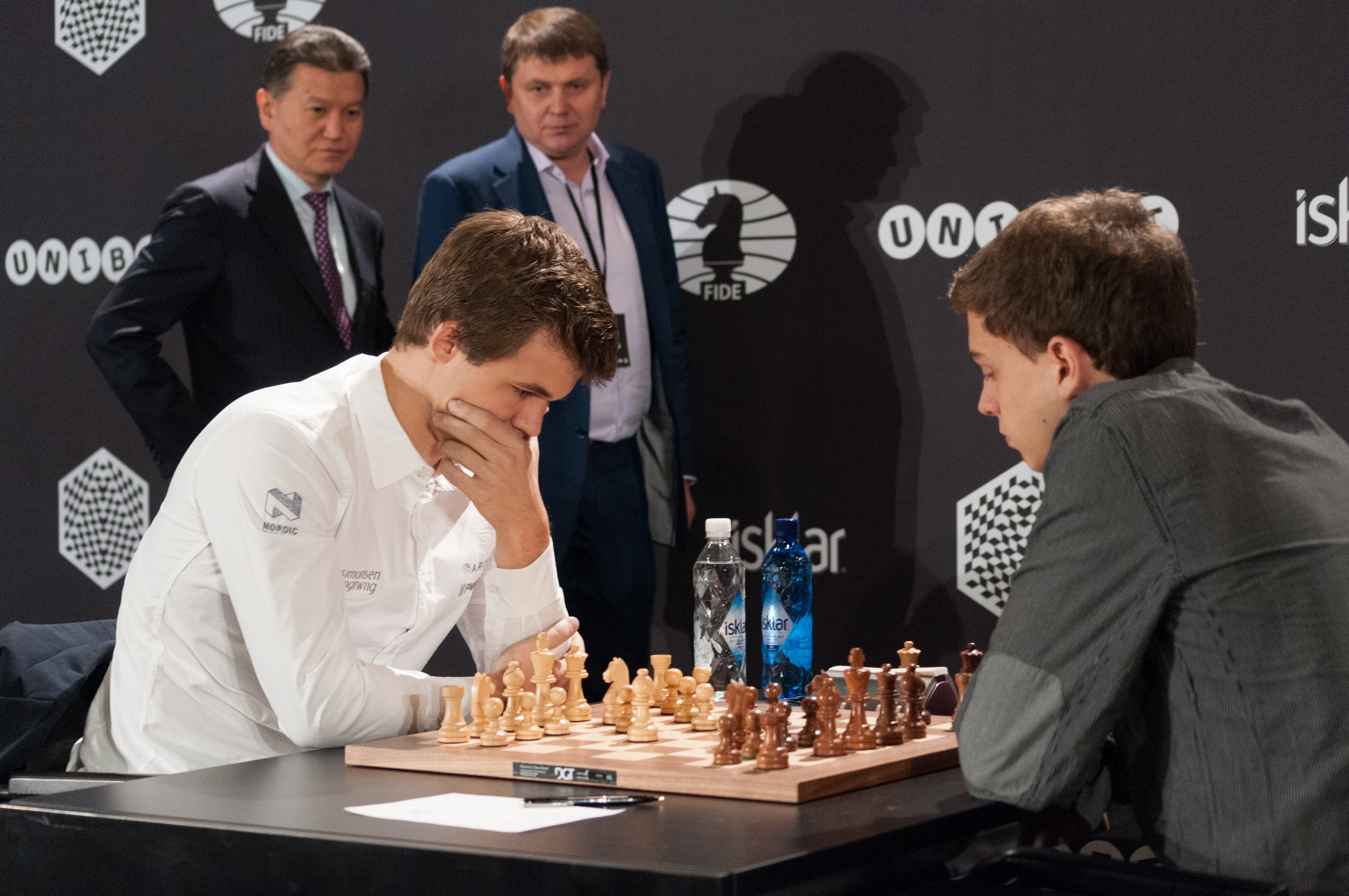
Magnus Carlsen (left) playing GM Dennis Wagner (right) at the 2015 FIDE World Chess Rapid and Blitz Championship in Berlin, at which Carlsen retained the title World Rapid Chess Champion

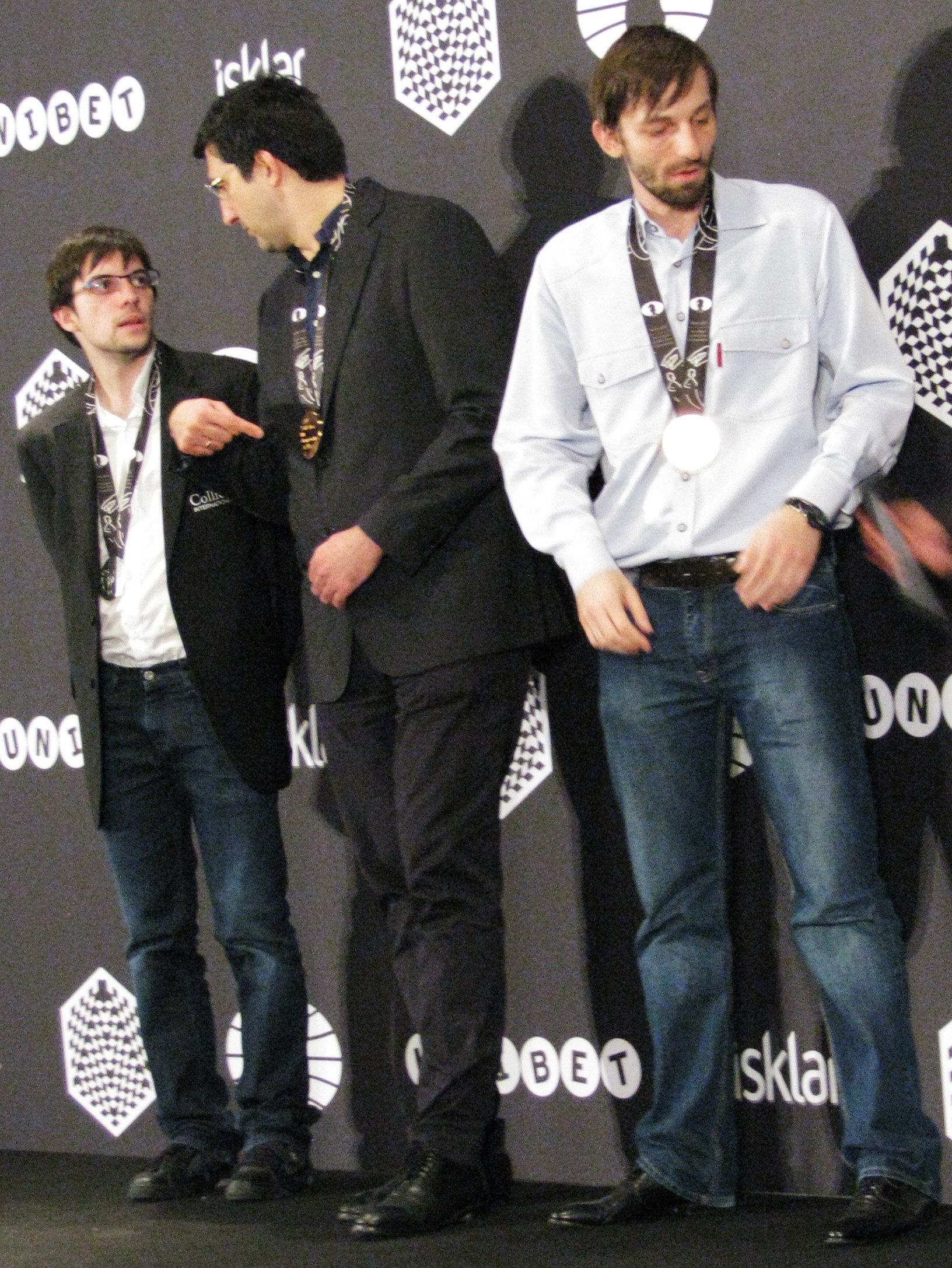
Blitz World Champion Alexander Grischuk (right) in Berlin, 2015, with runners-up Vladimir Kramnik (center) and Maxime Vachier-Lagrave (left)

Since 2012, FIDE have held joint World Rapid and Blitz Championships most years, with some years Women's World Rapid and Blitz Championships also being held.

In 2012, the World Rapid and Blitz Championships were held at Batumi, Georgia and Astana, Kazakhstan (Women's Championships) Sergey Karjakin won the Rapid Championship. Alexander Grischuk won the Blitz Championship. Antoaneta Stefanova won the Women's Rapid Championship. Valentina Gunina won the Women's Blitz Championship.

In 2013, the World Rapid and Blitz Championships were held at Khanty-Mansiysk, Russia. Shakhriyar Mamedyarov won the Rapid Championship. Lê Quang Liêm won the Blitz Championship.

In 2014, the World Rapid and Blitz Championships were held at Dubai, UAE and Khanty-Mansiysk, Russia (Women's Championships). Magnus Carlsen won both Rapid and Blitz Championships. Kateryna Lagno won the Women's Rapid Championship. Anna Muzychuk won the Women's Blitz Championship.

In 2015, the World Rapid and Blitz Championships were held in Berlin, Germany. Magnus Carlsen won the Rapid Championship. He also received the privilege of playing at a dedicated Board 1 the whole time, not having to move while others did. The given reason was that Norwegian television was sponsoring the event, and moving the heavy cameras around would be too much hassle. After his first-round draw, he should not have been on Board 1 until Round 8 when he caught the leaders. Carlsen himself later called this "weird" that Board 1 would be reserved for him. Alexander Grischuk won the Blitz Championship.

In 2015, FIDE did not receive the expected 80,000 euros from Agon's organization of the event, causing a budget shortfall of 55,000 euros. It was later announced that approximately 200,000 euros were lost on the event.

In 2016, the World Rapid Championships were held at the Ali Bin Hamad Al Attiya Arena in Doha, Qatar. Vassily Ivanchuk of Ukraine won the 2016 World Rapid Championship, while Carlsen, after defending his title with difficulty in 2015, came in third place. In the Blitz Championship, Sergey Karjakin of Russia and contender in the recently held World Chess Championship 2016 won the championship title albeit due to a better tiebreak over the second place Carlsen. Karjakin defeated Carlsen in their individual encounter. Carlsen was once again reserved board 1 for both championships. Anna Muzychuk also from Ukraine, won both the 2016 Women World Rapid and Blitz Championshipship.

At the FIDE Presidential Board meeting at the end of March 2016, they gave Agon six months to find an organizer for the 2017 event. At the Baku General Assembly in September, it was announced they had extended this deadline until the end of 2016. The issue of the non-payment of the players for the IMSA Mind Games was also brought up.

=== Champions tables for official events ===
World Rapid chess champions
| # | Name | Year | Country |
|---|---|---|---|
| 1 | Anatoly Karpov | 1988 | Soviet Union |
| 2 | Garry Kasparov | 2001 | Russia |
| 3 | Viswanathan Anand | 2003 | India |
| 4 | Sergey Karjakin | 2012 | Russia |
| 5 | Shakhriyar Mamedyarov | 2013 | Azerbaijan |
| 6 | Magnus Carlsen | 2014 | Norway |
| 7 | Magnus Carlsen | 2015 | Norway |
| 8 | Vasyl Ivanchuk | 2016 | Ukraine |
| 9 | Viswanathan Anand | 2017 | India |
| 10 | Daniil Dubov | 2018 | Russia |
| 11 | Magnus Carlsen | 2019 | Norway |
| 12 | Nodirbek Abdusattorov | 2021 | Uzbekistan |
| 13 | Magnus Carlsen | 2022 | Norway |
| 14 | Magnus Carlsen | 2023 | Norway |
| 15 | Volodar Murzin | 2024 | FIDE |
| 16 | Magnus Carlsen | 2025 | Norway |

Women's World Rapid chess champions
| # | Name | Year | Country |
|---|---|---|---|
| 1 | Zsuzsa Polgár | 1992 | Hungary |
| 2 | Antoaneta Stefanova | 2012 | Bulgaria |
| 3 | Kateryna Lagno | 2014 | Ukraine |
| 4 | Anna Muzychuk | 2016 | Ukraine |
| 5 | Ju Wenjun | 2017 | China |
| 6 | Ju Wenjun | 2018 | China |
| 7 | Koneru Humpy | 2019 | India |
| 8 | Alexandra Kosteniuk | 2021 | CFR |
| 9 | Tan Zhongyi | 2022 | China |
| 10 | Anastasia Bodnaruk | 2023 | FIDE |
| 11 | Koneru Humpy | 2024 | India |
| 12 | Aleksandra Goryachkina | 2025 | FIDE |

World Blitz chess champions
| # | Name | Year | Country |
|---|---|---|---|
| 1 | Bobby Fischer | 1970 | United States |
| 2 | Mikhail Tal | 1988 | Soviet Union |
| 3 | Viswanathan Anand | 2000 | India |
| 4 | Alexander Grischuk | 2006 | Russia |
| 5 | Vasyl Ivanchuk | 2007 | Ukraine |
| 6 | Leinier Domínguez | 2008 | Cuba |
| 7 | Magnus Carlsen | 2009 | Norway |
| 8 | Levon Aronian | 2010 | Armenia |
| 9 | Alexander Grischuk | 2012 | Russia |
| 10 | Lê Quang Liêm | 2013 | Vietnam |
| 11 | Magnus Carlsen | 2014 | Norway |
| 12 | Alexander Grischuk | 2015 | Russia |
| 13 | Sergey Karjakin | 2016 | Russia |
| 14 | Magnus Carlsen | 2017 | Norway |
| 15 | Magnus Carlsen | 2018 | Norway |
| 16 | Magnus Carlsen | 2019 | Norway |
| 17 | Maxime Vachier-Lagrave | 2021 | France |
| 18 | Magnus Carlsen | 2022 | Norway |
| 19 | Magnus Carlsen | 2023 | Norway |
| 20 | Magnus Carlsen; Ian Nepomniachtchi | 2024 | Norway; FIDE |
| 21 | Magnus Carlsen | 2025 | Norway |

Women's World Blitz chess champions
| # | Name | Year | Country |
|---|---|---|---|
| 1 | Zsuzsa Polgár | 1992 | Hungary |
| 2 | Kateryna Lagno | 2010 | Ukraine |
| 3 | Valentina Gunina | 2012 | Russia |
| 4 | Anna Muzychuk | 2014 | Slovenia |
| 5 | Anna Muzychuk | 2016 | Ukraine |
| 6 | Nana Dzagnidze | 2017 | Georgia |
| 7 | Kateryna Lagno | 2018 | Russia |
| 8 | Kateryna Lagno | 2019 | Russia |
| 9 | Bibisara Assaubayeva | 2021 | Kazakhstan |
| 10 | Bibisara Assaubayeva | 2022 | Kazakhstan |
| 11 | Valentina Gunina | 2023 | FIDE |
| 12 | Ju Wenjun | 2024 | China |
| 13 | Bibisara Assaubayeva | 2025 | Kazakhstan |

== Views on fast chess ==
Many top chess players disagree on the validity of fast chess compared to standard time controls as well as the usefulness of fast time controls for serious training.

Some quotes from top chess players may serve to illustrate this:

- "I don't know if bullet is useful but I think blitz is 100% useful. Blitz develops instincts." — Magnus Carlsen
- "Any coach that's trying to dissuade you from enjoying blitz is doing you a disservice." — Magnus Carlsen
- "To be honest, I consider [bullet chess] a bit moronic, and therefore I never play it." — Vladimir Kramnik
- "Blitz – it's just a pleasure." — Vladimir Kramnik
- "Blitz is simply a waste of time." — Vladimir Malakhov
- "Blitz is the opposite [of classical chess], you don't care at all. You can be drunk, you can dance all night, whatever happens you just need to be lucky and it will work." – Daniil Dubov
- "I play way too much blitz chess. It rots the brain just as surely as alcohol." — Nigel Short

== See also ==
- World Rapid Chess Championship
- World Blitz Chess Championship
