= Axiarchism =

Metaphysical position

Axiarchism (from Greek axia {ἀξία, a-ksi-a} 'value' and arche {ἀρχή < (verb) ἄρχω} 'rule') is a metaphysical position that everything that exists, including the universe itself, exists for a good purpose. The word was coined by Canadian philosopher John Leslie.
