= Crazyhouse =

Chess variant

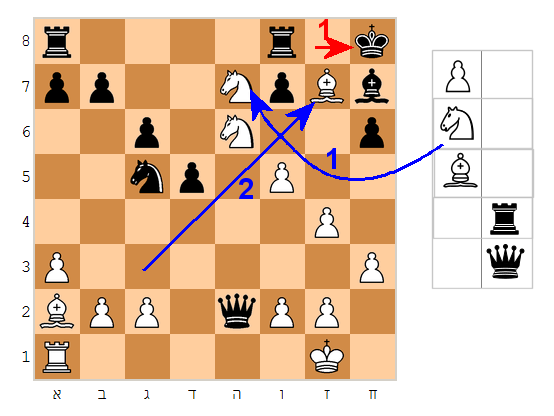
1.N@e7+ Kh8 2.Bxg7# (@ notation)

Crazyhouse is a chess variant in which captured enemy pieces can be reintroduced, or dropped, into the game as one's own, similarly to shogi. It was derived as a two-player, single-board variant of bughouse chess.

== History ==
Though the four-player "bughouse" chess became prominent in western chess circles in the 1960s, the crazyhouse variant did not rise to prominence until the era of 1990s online chess servers, though it may be traced back further to the "Mad Mate" variant made in 1972 by Alex Randolph, a Bohemian-American game designer who moved to Japan and became an amateur dan-level Shogi player.

== Rules ==
The rules of chess apply except for the addition of drops, as explained below.

- A piece that is captured reverses color and goes to the capturing player's reserve (aka pocket or bank), where it is considered held or in hand.
- On any turn, instead of making a move with a piece on the board, a player can drop one of their held pieces onto an empty square on the board.
- A pawn may not be dropped on the 1st or 8th ranks.
- A pawn that is dropped on its 2nd rank may use its two-square initial advance; a pawn that is dropped on any other rank cannot.
- When a piece that is promoted from a pawn is captured, it enters the opponent's reserve as a pawn.

Unlike in shogi, dropping a pawn on a file containing another pawn of the same color and dropping a pawn to deliver checkmate are both permissible.

== Notation ==
Crazyhouse's notation system is an extension of the standard algebraic notation. A drop is notated with the appropriate letter indicating the piece, with an at sign placed immediately before the destination square. For example, N@d5 means "knight is dropped on d5."

== FEN ==
There is no standard FEN specification for Crazyhouse. Lichess uses an extended version of FEN, adding a 9th rank as a reserve. Here is an example of Lichess's FEN implementation:

r2qk3/pp2bqR1/2p5/8/3Pn3/3BPpB1/PPPp1PPP/RK1R4/PNNNbpp b - - 89 45

In XBoard/Winboard's notation system, the reserve is given in square brackets following the board position:

r2qk3/pp2bqR1/2p5/8/3Pn3/3BPpB1/PPPp1PPP/RK1R4[PNNNbpp] b - - 89 45

In Chess.com's notation system, the reserve is located after the full-move number.

To keep track of which pieces are promoted, Lichess and XBoard/Winboard use "~" after the letter designation. Chess.com uses the coordinates of the pieces.

r2q1r1k/2p1ppb1/p2p2pp/3P1p2/B6B/2N2NPp/1PP2P1K/3Q3q w - - 0 26 NNBRpr h1

== Criticisms ==
GM Larry Kaufman wrote: "[Crazyhouse] is rather fun and interesting, but the games tend to be short, and it is almost certain that White has a forced win, although it would probably be too difficult to prove this and certainly too difficult to memorize all the possible variations."

== See also ==
- Hostage chess, a variant where a player can drop back into play their own previously captured pieces
