= John A. Leslie =

Canadian philosopher and writer (born 1940)

John Leslie
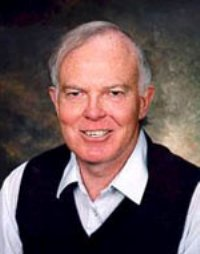
- Born: August 2, 1940 (age 86)

Philosophical work
- Era: Contemporary philosophy
- Region: Western philosophy
- School: Analytic philosophy
- Main interests: Philosophy of religion Philosophy of science Philosophy of mind Metaphysics; Ethics

John Andrew Leslie (born 2 August 1940) is a Canadian philosopher and writer.

== Biography ==
Leslie was educated at Wadham College, Oxford, earning his B.A. in English Literature in 1962 and his M.Litt. in Classics in 1968. He is currently Professor emeritus at the University of Guelph, in Ontario, Canada.

In his book Universes, Leslie describes a philosophical parable in which an individual survives a firing squad of fifty expert marksmen unscathed. He offers two explanations for this remarkable event: either it is a fortuitous outcome, to be expected occasionally by pure chance among many thousands of attempted executions by firing squad; or it is intentional. Francis Collins references this parable in his book The Language of God: A Scientist Presents Evidence for Belief as part of his argument that the Anthropic Principle strongly suggests a Creator with intent.

Leslie has spoken as follows about his life's work:

What I have to contribute is some technical defense of the idea that if you had an infinitely rich [universe], it could be explained by reference to its value. Its goodness could be the creative force which had produced it. I think if I would like to be remembered as a philosopher for any one thing, that would be the thing I'd most like to be remembered for.

== Pantheism ==
Leslie is a pantheist. His philosophical work takes influence from David Lewis, Plato and Spinoza.

In his book Infinite Minds: A Philosophical Cosmology (2001), Leslie argues for a pantheistic universe in which everything exists in a divine mind. Philosopher Brendan Sweetman commented that the book promotes a "highly speculative, pantheistic theory that is fascinating in its own way, but that will probably convince very few." Leslie's book is unique because he accepts and uses arguments for the existence of God which are usually used to support theism such as a version of the cosmological argument and the design argument based on fine-tuning, but he explains these in a pantheistic way.

== Selected publications ==
- Value and Existence (1979)
- Universes (1989)
- Physical Cosmology and Philosophy (1990)
- The End of the World: The Science and Ethics of Human Extinction. (1996)
- Modern Cosmology and Philosophy (1998)
- Infinite Minds: A Philosophical Cosmology (2001)
- Immortality Defended (2007)
- The Mystery of Existence: Why is there Anything At All? (2013)
- What God Might Be (2018)

== See also ==
- Axiarchism – a term invented by John Leslie for the metaphysical belief that the world is largely or entirely determined by what is ethically valuable, and that things in this world have an intrinsic desire for the good
- Doomsday argument – a probabilistic argument that claims to predict number of future members of the human species given only an estimate of the total number of humans born so far
- Hostage Chess – a chess variant invented by Leslie
