= Hostage chess =

Chess variant

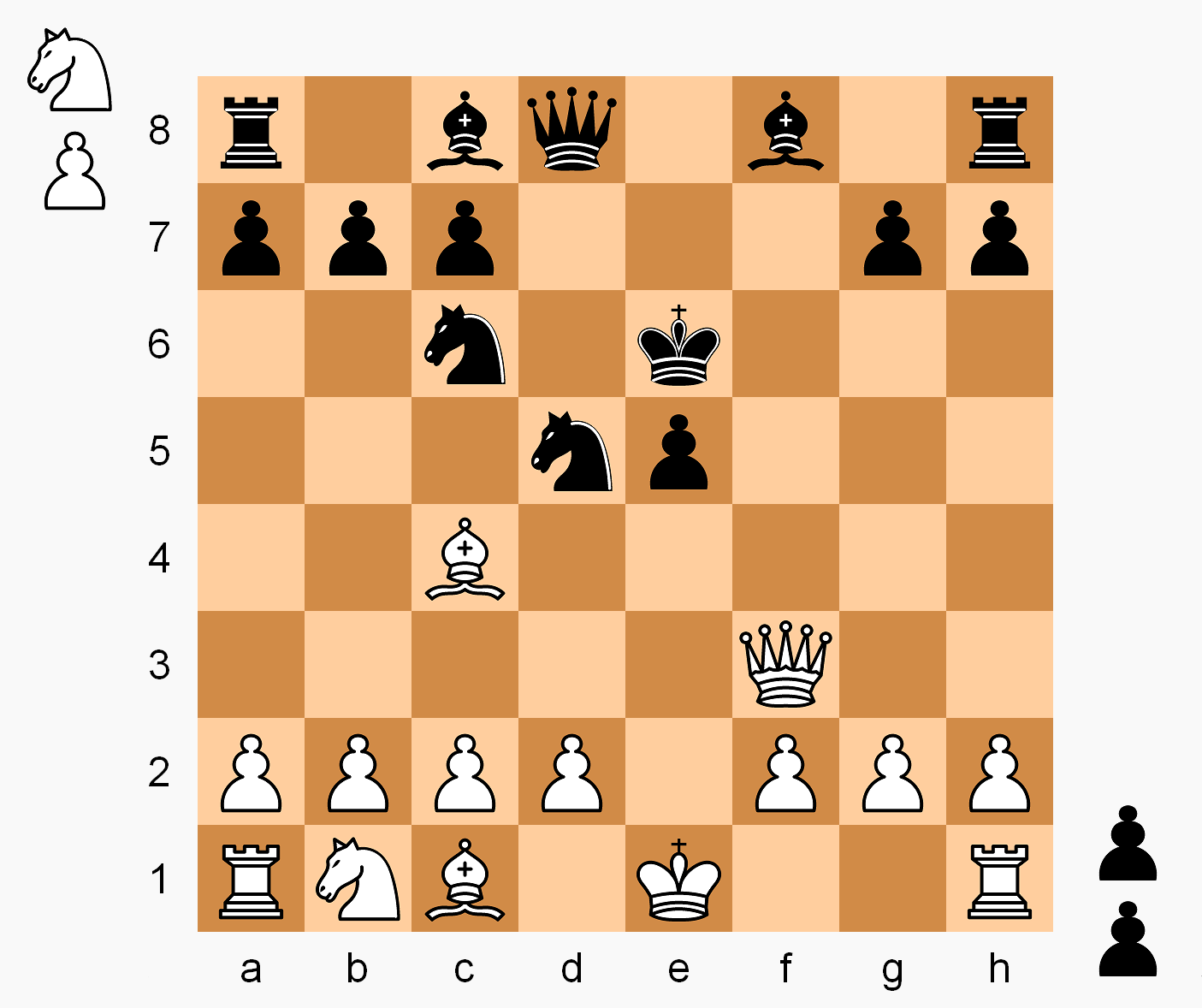
In the Fried Liver Attack (1.e4 e5 2.Nf3 Nc6 3.Bc4 Nf6 4.Ng5 d5 5.exd5 Nxd5 6.Nxf7 Kxf7 7.Qf3+ Ke6; see diagram), Black is okay in standard chess, but in hostage chess the line fails: White wins a knight with 8.Bxd5+, since if Black recaptures 8...Qxd5, White plays the hostage exchange 9.(N-B)B*f7+ (transferring the black knight in their prison to Black's airfield, then releasing the white bishop from Black's prison and dropping it on f7 with check) to win Black's queen.

Hostage chess is a chess variant invented by John A. Leslie in 1997. Captured pieces are not eliminated from the game but can reenter active play through drops, similar to shogi. Unlike shogi, the piece a player may drop is one of their own pieces previously captured by the opponent. In exchange, the player returns a previously captured enemy piece which the opponent may drop on a future turn. This is the characteristic feature of the game.

Hostage chess has tactical subtlety and "tends to favour the attacker". In 1999, David Pritchard called the game "the variant of the decade". It was published in magazines Nost-algia (issue 375), Eteroscacco (86–88), and Variant Chess (32 and later (Note: VC issues 32, 35, 36, 37, 38, 39, 46, 48, 54, 59, 61, and 64)). It was the "Recognized Variant of the Month" in January 2005 at The Chess Variant Pages.

== Game rules ==
Hostage chess follows all the standard rules of chess excepting how captured men are treated. Each player owns reserved spaces off the chessboard: a prison to the player's right, and an airfield to the player's left. There should be a clear boundary between each player's prison and the other player's airfield. Captured men are not removed from the game but are held in the capturer's prison. Instead of making a normal move, a player can perform a hostage exchange to "rescue" a man held prisoner by the opponent and drop the freed man back into play on the board onto an open square. The man exchanged for the dropped man is transferred from the player's prison to the opponent's airfield. On any turn, instead of making a normal move, a player can drop a man from his airfield into active play on the board.

=== Hostage exchanges ===
A hostage exchange is performed by transferring a piece from one's prison to the opponent's airfield, then selecting and releasing a piece from the opponent's prison and immediately dropping it onto an empty square on the board. The drop completes the turn. The piece transferred must be of equal or greater value than the piece released from prison and dropped. The relative piece values are: Q > R > B = N > P. (So, any piece can be exchanged to free a pawn; whereas only a queen can be exchanged to free a queen.) A hostage exchange cannot be refused by the opponent.

=== Drops ===
A drop can occur as part of a hostage exchange, or directly from a player's airfield. The square dropped to must be unoccupied. Additional drop rules:

- A pawn may not be dropped on the 1st or 8th ranks. A pawn dropped on the player's 2nd rank inherits the normal two-step move option. A dropped pawn may not be captured en passant immediately after the drop.
- A rook dropped on a rook starting square can be used in castling.
- A bishop can be dropped onto the same color square as a friendly bishop already on the board.

=== Pawn promotions ===
A pawn can promote only to a Q, R, B, or N that is available in the opponent's prison. The promoting player selects which piece to release and promote to; the pawn is transferred to the opponent's prison. If the promoted piece is subsequently captured, it retains the type that it had when entering prison.

So, if a pawn is on its player's 7th rank with no available piece to promote to:

1. The pawn cannot advance.
2. If the opponent's king is diagonally in front of the pawn:
  - The pawn does not give check.
  - The opponent may not capture a Q, R, B, or N (since to do so would make the pawn eligible to promote, putting the player in self-check).

== Advantages over Chessgi ==
According to David Pritchard:

Hostage Chess, for want of a better description, is a Chessgi variant. But a variant with two advantages. In the first place, it uses a single chess set, effectively pushing Chessgi, with its requirement for two sets and the almost inevitable confusion that that causes (have you tried playing it over the board?) into limbo, except perhaps for correspondence play. And secondly it introduces additional skill elements that are difficult to evaluate, which in my view make the game much more interesting.

== Notation ==
Standard notation is used with some extensions:

- A drop is indicated by an asterisk (*). For example, N*c7 means that a knight was dropped from the player's airfield onto c7.
- For a hostage exchange, (round brackets) contain the man exchanged followed by the man freed from prison and dropped. For example, (B-N)N*c7 means that a bishop was exchanged to free a knight, and the knight was dropped onto c7.
- Pawns are notated P in hostage exchanges, for example: (P-P)*g5. The move *g5 means that a pawn was dropped from the player's airfield onto g5.

== Example game ==
White: Frank Parr Black: David Pritchard Casual game

1. d4 d5 2. c4

Developing.

2... dxc4

The captured pawn is held hostage in Black's prison.

3. Nc3 e5 4. d5 c6 5. e4 b5

Developing.

6. dxc6

Now White also holds a hostage.

6... (P-P)*d4

Black exchanges hostages and drops their freed pawn onto d4. White now has a pawn in their airfield.

7. *d7

White drops the pawn from their airfield. Black is not in check since White cannot promote, because there is no imprisoned piece to exchange the pawn with.

7... Nxc6 8. Qxd4

Both sides capture a pawn.

8... Bxd7

Black cannot take the white queen, because that capture would provide an imprisoned white queen for the white pawn to promote to, thus illegally checking themselves. But Black can threaten the white queen, and does so, while capturing a pawn.

9. Qd1

The queen escapes danger.

9... (P-P)*d4

Pawn prisoner swap, and a pawn drop.

10. Nd5 Bb4+ 11. Bd2 Bxd2+ 12. Qxd2 Be6 13. a4

Moves including checks and a bishop swap.

13... Bxd5 14. exd5

Bishop for knight swap.

14... (B-B)B*b4

Bishop prisoner swap and drop.

15. *c3 dxc3 16. bxc3

Pawn drop and then swap.

16... Bxc3! 17. Qxc3

Bishop for pawn sacrifice.

17... (N-B)B*b4

Knight for bishop swap and drop.

18. Qxb4 Nxb4

Queen for bishop swap. To free their queen from prison, White would have to first capture Black's queen. But White's queen is in Black's prison, and so Black can sacrifice their queen any time, then promptly re-enter it via a hostage exchange.

19. Rb1

Rook move.

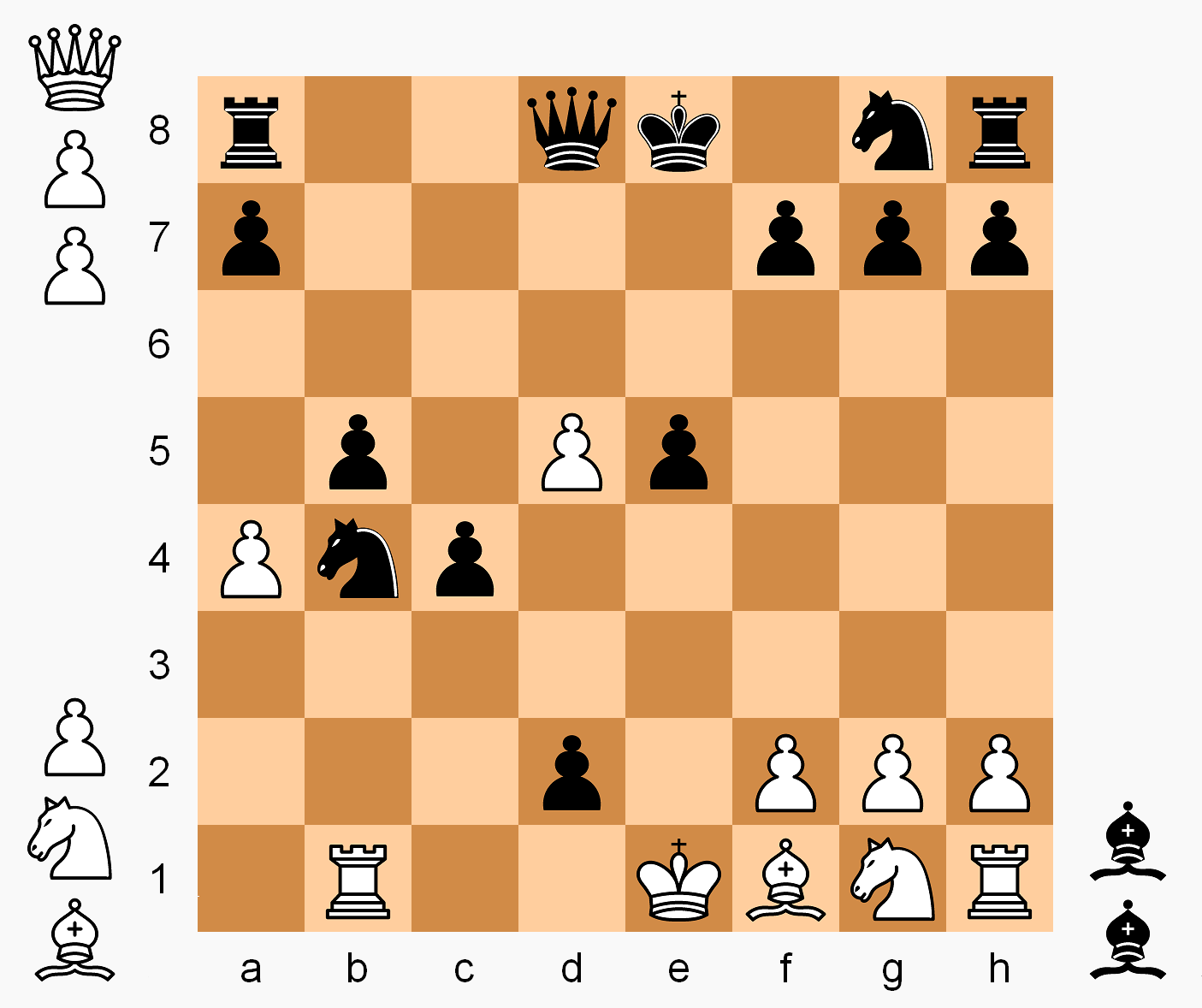
Position after 19...(P-P)*d2+

19... (P-P)*d2+ (diagram) 20. Kxd2

Pawn swap and drop with check to force the white king to capture it and thus move.
Pritchard annotates:

"Or 20.Kd1 Qxd5, and now 21.N*c7+ achieves nothing, as neither the queen nor the rook can be taken, as Black then exchanges hostages and mates on e1. If instead 21.Rxb4, Black has the crushing 21...Qd3, which threatens both (Q-N)N*c3 and (Q-B)B*c2. White could try 21.N*e3, but after Qd3 there follows 22.Nf3 Qxb1+ 23.Kxd2, when Black again mates, or 21.*c2 Qd3 22.N*e3 Qxf1+ wins easily, all of which attest to the extraordinary vitality of the game."

20... Qxd5+ 21. Kc1 Na2+ 22. Kc2 (P-P)*b3+ 23. Kb2 (Q-B)B*c3+ 24. Ka3

Four checks (two plain, and a P for P prisoner swap and drop, and a Q for B disadvantageous prisoner swap and drop) chase the white king into the mating trap.

24... b4# 0–1

Checkmate. A black pawn that had been waiting in Black's airfield, parachutes onto a square covered by their queen. The king cannot escape. The end.
