= Lars Oskar Hauge =

Norwegian chess grandmaster (born 1998)

Personal information
- Born: 17 November 1998 (age 27)

Chess career
- Country: Norway
- Title: Grandmaster (2022)
- FIDE rating: 2485 (July 2026)
- Peak rating: 2533 (August 2022)

Lars Oskar Hauge (born 1998) is a Norwegian chess grandmaster.

Qualifying for the Grandmaster title in 2021, he is listed as the 17th Norwegian GM. Hauge achieved his first Grandmaster norm in the Norwegian Premier League in 2018/19, with subsequent norms in the Swedish Elitserien 2019/20 and at the European Team Chess Championship in Brezice in 2021. He was designated FIDE Master in 2013, International Master in 2016 and GM in 2022.
