= Premove =

Online chess move input type

In online chess, a premove is a move input made by a player during their opponent's turn, taking effect only after the opponent moves. A premove is performed in the same way as a normal move, most commonly by dragging the piece to its destination, or by clicking the piece and then clicking its destination.

Premoving is available on chess websites such as the Internet Chess Club, the Free Internet Chess Server, Chess.com, and Lichess.

== Description ==
To premove, a player makes a move input in the same way as they would if it were their turn. After their opponent moves, the premove is immediately executed, provided that the resulting move is legal; otherwise, the premove is discarded. One can cancel a premove by clicking anywhere on the board; if only one premove is allowed at a time, then one can also cancel a premove by making another premove.

On most chess websites, a piece's premove options are dependent only on its location and type; no other considerations of the board state are relevant. For example, one can make a premove that would leave their king in check if it were their turn; one can premove a pawn capture even if there is no opposing piece to be captured; and so on. For a castling premove, it is also required that the rook to be castled with is present; additionally, it is generally required that the castling rights of the king and rook have been maintained. Such apparently impossible premoves are allowed because the opponent's upcoming move may change the position in a way that allows the premove to be executed.

On Lichess, a premove can be made only if the resulting move would be a legal response to one of the moves that the opponent can make.

Some websites, such as Chess.com, offer the option of making multiple premoves at once. Each premove is executed in sequence if possible; however, if any premove fails to be executed, then it and all subsequent premoves in the sequence are cancelled.

On certain websites, premoves use up no time on the clock, such as in Lichess. However, on other chess websites (such as Chess.com), each premove takes 0.1 seconds exactly. This is sometimes helpful when counting the maximum possible moves you or your oppenent could play in their remaining time.

Lichess offers the options to input moves with the keyboard and with one's voice; premoving is supported in these modes.

== Strategy ==
Premoving is used both recreationally and to avoid letting one's clock run out. Generally, it is only done when either the move would be good in any subsequent position where it is valid or the player is in time trouble. It is most often used when anticipating a capture by an opponent so as to recapture the capturing piece. Premoves can be risky if the opponent anticipates it and/or does something unexpected, as in the Rosen Trap, named after International Master Eric Rosen, a colloquial name for exploiting time trouble and an opponent using pre-moves to generate a stalemate in situations where a loss is otherwise assured using a move that is suboptimal in terms of keeping the game going longer but when combined with an opponent premoving based on the expectation of an optimal move, causes the player to have no legal moves.

Position: d8 white king, h3 white pawn, b2 black king, c2 white queen

A basic example of the Rosen Trap: White played 1. Qxc2+, expecting 1...Kxc2 and so premoves 2. h4. Instead, Black moves 1...Ka1?!, which is still losing. However, 2. h4?? is now stalemate (correct is 2. Qd2), and Black has swindled a draw out of a completely losing situation.
