= David S. Heeschen =

American radio astronomer

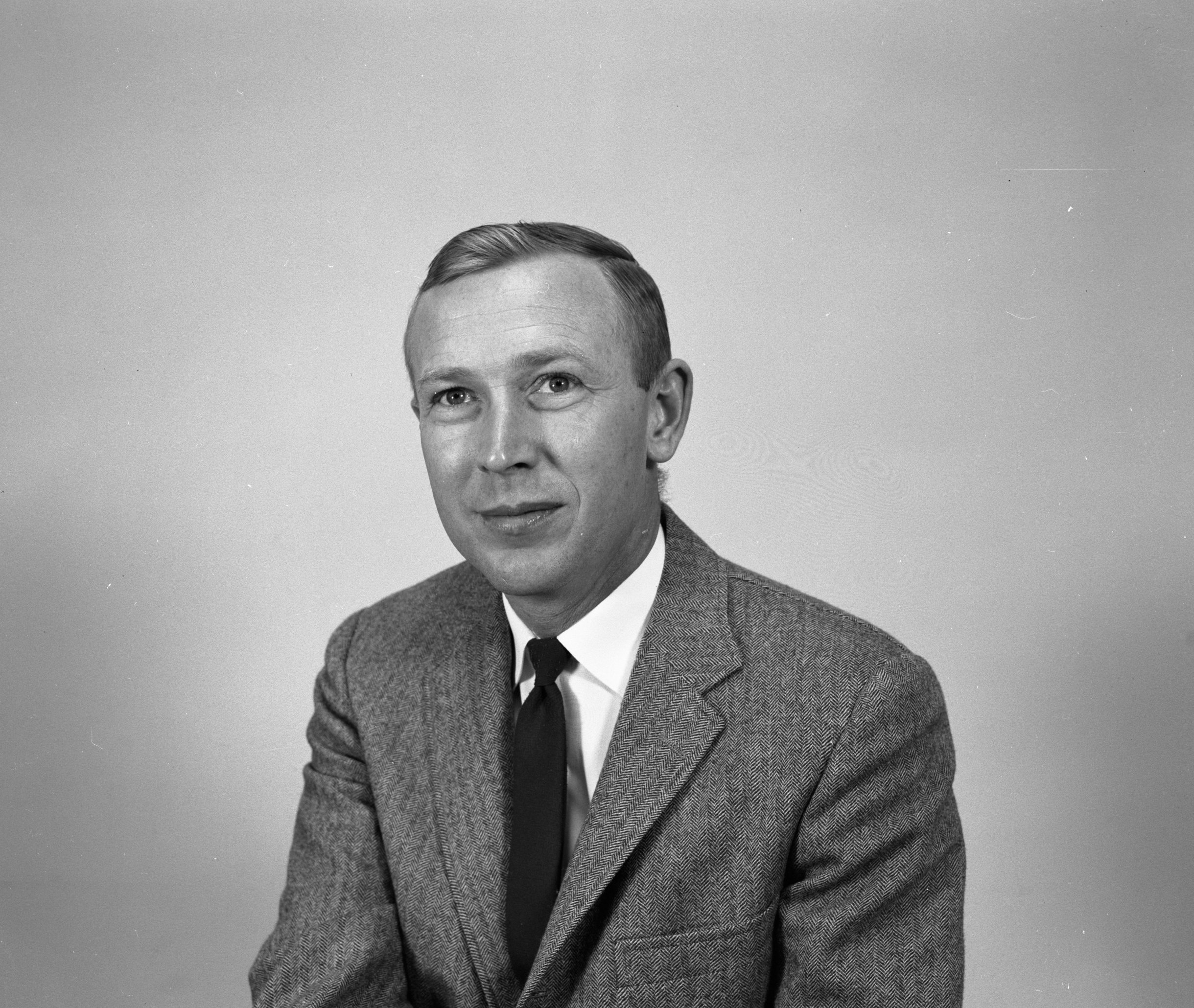
David S Heeschen

David Sutphin Heeschen (March 12, 1926 – April 13, 2012) was an American radio astronomer, best known for his long and influential tenure as director of the U.S. National Radio Astronomy Observatory (NRAO) during the time that radio astronomy was transformed from a hands-on approach by a few individuals building their own instruments to a discipline with staff-supported user facilities servicing often large teams of dedicated observers.

Heeschen grew up in Chicago, Illinois, during the hardships of the Great Depression. He served one year in the Army at the end of World War II, then enrolled at the University of Illinois intending to study agricultural science. Instead, he received his B.S. degree in engineering physics in 1949, and an M.S. degree in astronomy in 1951. Studying under Bart Bok at Harvard, Heeschen completed his Ph.D. in 1954. At Harvard, Heeschen played a leading role in commissioning the university's 24-foot and 60-foot radio telescopes. After spending one year as an instructor at Wesleyan University he returned to Harvard as a lecturer and research associate.

In 1956, NSF awarded a contract to fund a new national facility in radio astronomy to Associated Universities, Inc. (AUI), a consortium of originally nine universities, including Harvard. AUI already held the contract to manage Brookhaven National Laboratories, but this was quite a different venture. Heeschen resigned his position at Harvard and soon moved with his family to Green Bank, West Virginia, the remote location of the new radio observatory. As the first NRAO scientific staff member, he soon became the assistant to Otto Struve, who had been appointed NRAO director after a rocky search. Indeed, Struve proved unequal to the task of constructing the planned new 140-foot radio telescope. He resigned, and Heeschen was appointed as acting director at the age of 36, becoming, in 1962, director. During his subsequent eighteen-year tenure, he oversaw the construction of the 140-foot antenna, a 300-foot telescope, a 4-element interferometer; at Tucson, Arizona, a high-precision 36-foot telescope; and the Very Large Array west of Socorro, New Mexico.

Heeschen was elected to the National Academy of Sciences in 1971. He resigned as director in 1978, becoming again a member of the NRAO scientific staff. He contributed to the innovative design of the 100-meter Green Bank Telescope which, beginning operation in 2000, became the leading instrument of its kind in the world. His own research was on extragalactic radio sources. He played an active role in the 1970, 1980, and 1990 decadal reviews of astronomy and astrophysics. Among other honors, he was president of the American Astronomical Society (1980-1982), a fellow in the American Academy of Arts and Sciences, a member of the American Philosophical Society, and a recipient of the NSF Distinguished Public Service award. An enthusiastic pursuer of serial hobbies, he was at various times an ice skater, hiker, hunter, sports car enthusiast, yachtsman, and ham radio operator, the latter with high-speed ratings in Morse code. His marriage to Eloise (née St. Clair) spanned from 1950 until her death in 2002.

Heeschen died at his home in Charlottesville, Virginia, in 2012 at the age of 86. His collected papers are in the NRAO archive.
