= B2 0648+27 =

Radio galaxy in the constellation Gemini

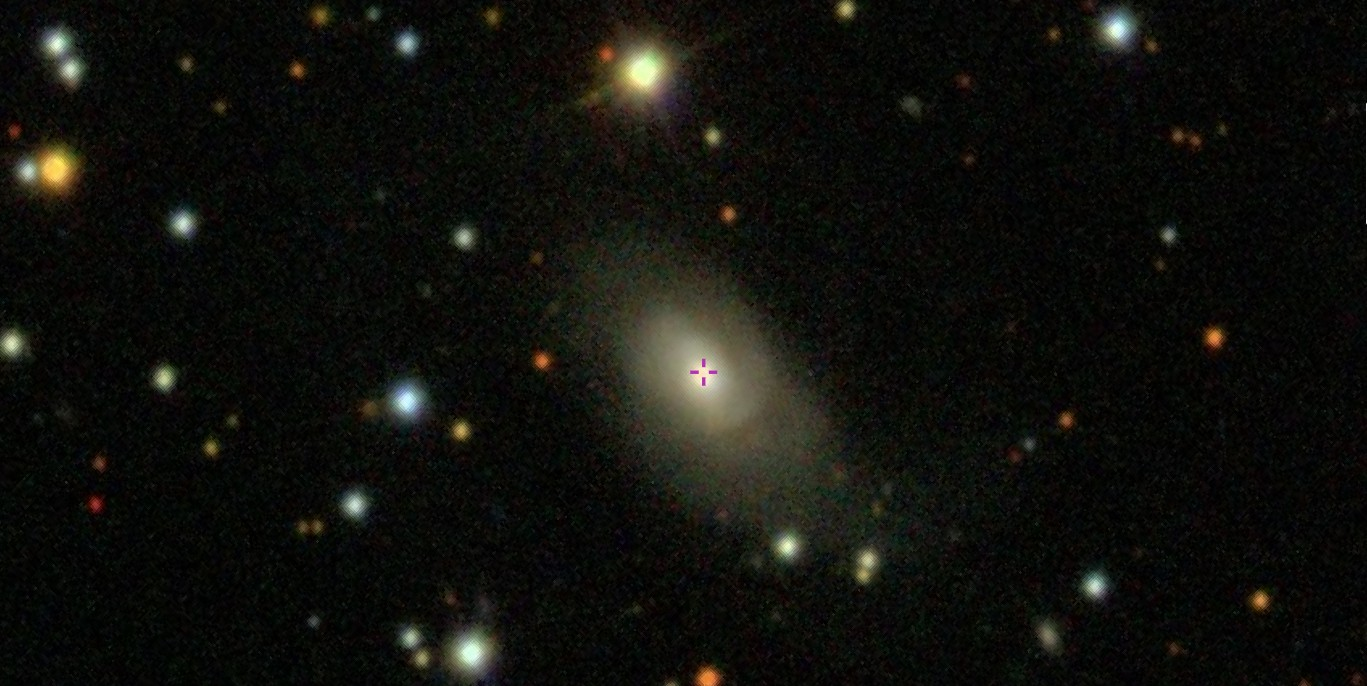
- The radio galaxy B2 0648+27.

Observation data (J2000 epoch)
- Constellation: Gemini
- Right ascension: 06^{h} 52^{m} 02.5089^{s}
- Declination: +27° 27′ 39.354″
- Redshift: 0.041429
- Heliocentric radial velocity: 12,420 km/s
- Distance: 575 Mly
- Apparent magnitude (B): 14.9

Characteristics
- Type: S0?
- Size: 78.48 kiloparsecs (256,000 light-years) (diameter; 2MASS K-band total isophote)
- Notable features: Radio galaxy with a H I ring structure surrounding it

Other designations
- MCG +05-16-010, CGCG 145-017, PGC 19747, IRAS 06488+2731

B2 0648+27 is a radio galaxy located 575 million light-years from Earth in the constellation of Gemini. It's redshift calculated from carbon monoxide detection is (z) 0.041 or 12,420 km s^{−1}, and it was first discovered by the Very Long Baseline Array (VLA) in 1985.

== Description ==
B2 0648+27 is classified as an early-type elliptical galaxy. It is known to have an irregular morphology when imaged by the Hubble Space Telescope (HST), with patchy distribution of dust filaments and a chain of knots located on the northern side of the galaxy, likely interpreted as star forming regions. In broadband optical multicolor CCD imaging the galaxy is surrounded by a low surface brightness envelope and a faint emission plume that is extending outwards from it. Also present are shell system or arc structures surrounding the galaxy, resolved by a two-color framing. The body of the galaxy measures 55 kiloparsecs (kpc) along its major axis with a broad tidal arm protruding from the south-western direction. Low surface brightness tidal tails are curling around both eastern and northern halves of the galaxy.

A large extended H I region ring was discovered encircling the galaxy. The ring has a mass of 8.5 billion M_{☉} and a diameter of 190 kpc. Its appearance is asymmetric, with the highest concentration of H I gas located in the eastern structure region with a measured surface density of 1.7 M_{☉} pc^{−2}. This large ring of H I was formed from a major merger between either two gas-rich disk galaxies or one gas-rich spiral galaxy and one elliptical galaxy, 1.5 billion years ago. In addition, a young stellar population aged between 0.2 and 0.3 billion years has been found, indicative of a post-starburst event after the merger.

The source of B2 0648+27 is compact. Based on observations, it is shown to be slightly extended at lower frequencies. Radio imaging by the Very Large Array (VLA), showed the source to be double, made up of two components located in the north and south, resolved at 22 GHz frequencies. There is also a compact feature, likely the radio core, emerging northwards with a measured flux density of 2.5 mJy. There is a faint jet in the south-east. Both radio lobes showed no evidence of either hotspots or a jet-like structure. An observation also showed the source is aged only about 1 million years old with older external lobe regions, suggesting it is confined. Single antenna observations with the Very Long Baseline Array (VLBA) and VLA conducted in 1995, showed the source is orientated at 40° with a jet velocity of 0.7.
