= Associated Universities, Inc. =

American nonprofit organization

Associated Universities, Inc. (AUI)
- Logo of the Associated Universities, Inc. (AUI)
- Formation: 1946
- Purpose: To manage research facilities for the benefit of the international scientific community and the public.
- Headquarters: Washington, D.C., United States
- Official language: English
- President: Adam Cohen
- Website: aui.edu

Associated Universities, Inc. (AUI) is a research management corporation that builds and operates facilities for the research community. It is a not-for-profit 501(c)(3) corporation headquartered in Washington, D.C., United States. The current president is Adam Cohen. The corporation's major current operating unit is the National Radio Astronomy Observatory, which it operates under a Cooperative Agreement with the National Science Foundation.

The member institutions of the corporation are Columbia, Cornell, Harvard, Johns Hopkins, Massachusetts Institute of Technology, UPenn, Princeton, URochester, and Yale.

== History ==
AUI was established in 1946 as an educational institution dedicated to research, development, and education in the physical, biological and engineering sciences. Nine northeastern universities joined in sponsoring AUI in 1946: Columbia University, Cornell University, Harvard University, Johns Hopkins University, Massachusetts Institute of Technology, University of Pennsylvania, Princeton University, University of Rochester, and Yale University.

AUI was granted an absolute charter by the Board of Regents of the State University of New York Education Department, which called for AUI to "acquire, plan, construct and operate laboratories and other facilities" that would unite the resources of universities, other research organizations and the Federal Government. It was envisioned that AUI would create facilities and laboratories so large, complex, and costly as to be outside the scope of a single university. These facilities were to be made available on a competitive basis to all qualified scientists without regard to affiliation, as well as to resident scientific staff.

Over the years, AUI took on a broad national character with a diversified Board of Trustees from universities and other institutions across the country. The nine founding universities are still represented, although ties to their administrations are not of a formal nature.

From 1947 until 1998, AUI was responsible for building and then managing the Department of Energy's Brookhaven National Laboratory (BNL), a multi-disciplinary science research center located on Long Island, New York. In that period, AUI/BNL were responsible for the design, development, construction, and operation of numerous major facilities, the most recent being the National Synchrotron Light Source and the Relativistic Heavy Ion Collider. During AUI's management at Brookhaven, six Nobel prizes were awarded for research conducted wholly or partially at BNL. Four of those prizes were awarded to scientists at the laboratory, in 1957, 1976, 1980 and 1988. AUI lost the contract to manage the BNL in 1998 in the wake of a 1994 fire at the facility's high-beam flux reactor that exposed several workers to radiation and reports in 1997 of a leak of tritium into the groundwater of the Long Island Central Pine Barrens, on which the facility sits.

In 1955, AUI proposed the establishment of a national radio observatory and has managed the National Radio Astronomy Observatory (NRAO) for NSF since its creation in 1956.

In 2002, AUI was named by NSF as the North American Executive for the international Atacama Large Millimeter/submillimeter Array (ALMA).

In 2008, AUI, together with the Association of Universities for Research in Astronomy (AURA), created the Virtual Astronomical Observatory LLC, to manage the Virtual Astronomical Observatory for NSF and NASA.

In 2015, AUI, the National Science Foundation (NSF) selected Associated Universities, Inc. (AUI) to manage the National Radio Astronomy Observatory (NRAO) through a new 10-year cooperative agreement. The new agreement includes the operation of the Karl G. Jansky Very Large Array (VLA), the North American share of the international Atacama Large Millimeter/submillimeter Array (ALMA), and NRAO's development laboratories and administrative and management functions, effective 1 October 2016.

The Green Bank Telescope (GBT) and Very Long Baseline Array (VLBA), which were recommended for divestment several years ago, will exit NRAO and become independent facilities known as the Green Bank Observatory (GBO), with Karen O'Neill as its director, and the Long Baseline Observatory (LBO), with Walter Brisken as its director. Pending submission, review, and approval of a supplemental funding request, AUI will continue managing each under a separate cooperative agreement for the next two years, while NSF decides the long-term future of these facilities.

== AUI facilities ==
=== National Radio Astronomy Observatory (NRAO) ===
The National Radio Astronomy Observatory (NRAO), headquartered in Charlottesville, Virginia, is a Federally Funded Research and Development Center (FFRDC) operated by Associated Universities, Inc. under cooperative agreement with the United States National Science Foundation. NRAO designs, builds, and operates high sensitivity radio telescopes for use by scientists around the world.

NRAO telescopes are open to all astronomers regardless of institutional or national affiliation. Observing time on NRAO telescopes is available on a competitive basis to qualified scientists after evaluation of research proposals on the basis of scientific merit, the capability of the instruments to do the work, and the availability of the telescope during the requested time. NRAO also provides both formal and informal programs in education and public outreach for teachers, students, the general public, and the media. NRAO's facilities are discussed below.

==== Atacama Large Millimeter/submillimeter Array (ALMA) ====
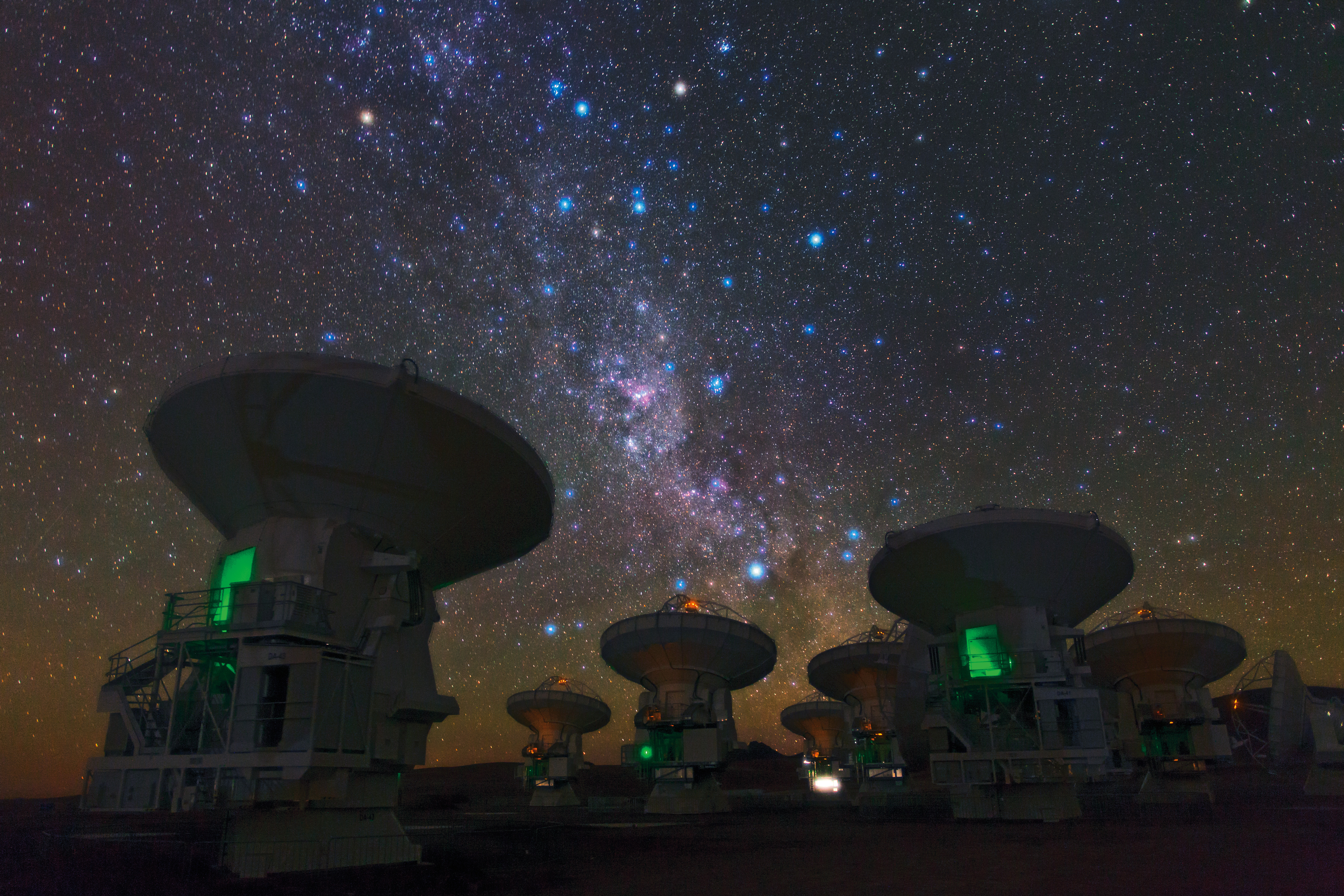
The Southern Milky Way Above ALMA

The Atacama Large Millimeter/submillimeter Array (ALMA), the world's most advanced millimeter/submillimeter observatory, is located on the Chajnantor plateau of the Chilean Andes near San Pedro de Atacama, 5000 m above sea level. ALMA was built by an international partnership comprising North America, Europe and East Asia, in cooperation with the Republic of Chile. AUI is the North American Executive for ALMA.

ALMA is an international astronomy facility, a single research instrument composed of 66 high-precision antennas which will enable transformational research into the physics of the cold Universe, regions that are optically dark but shine brightly in the millimeter portion of the electromagnetic spectrum. Providing astronomers with a new window on celestial origins, ALMA will probe the first stars and galaxies and directly image the formation of planets.

ALMA is funded in East Asia by the National Institutes of Natural Sciences (NINS) of Japan in cooperation with the Academia Sinica (AS) in Taiwan, in Europe by the European Organisation for Astronomical Research in the Southern Hemisphere (ESO) and in North America by the U.S. National Science Foundation (NSF) in cooperation with the National Research Council of Canada (NRC) and the National Science Council of Taiwan (NSC). ALMA construction and operations are led on behalf of East Asia by the National Astronomical Observatory of Japan (NAOJ), on behalf of Europe by ESO and on behalf of North America by the National Radio Astronomy Observatory (NRAO), which is managed by Associated Universities, Inc. (AUI).

==== Very Large Array (VLA)/ Expanded Very Large Array ====
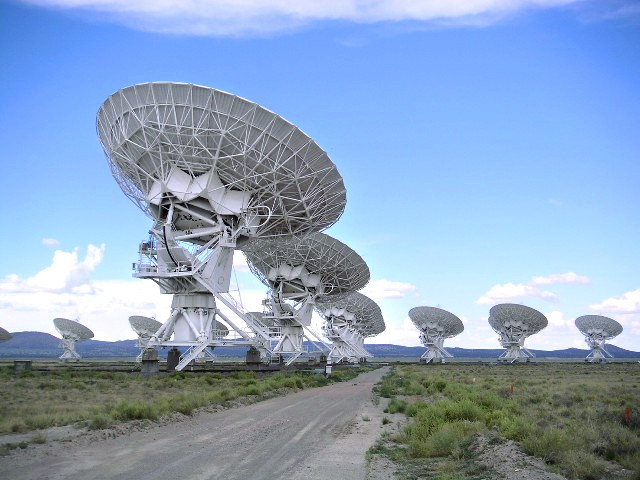
Very Large Array

The Very Large Array (VLA), an array of 27 25-meter antennas, is located on the Plains of San Agustin about 50 miles west of Socorro, New Mexico. Dedicated in 1980, it is an exceedingly powerful scientific instrument that has transformed many areas of astronomy, and has been used by more astronomers and has produced more scientific papers than any other radio telescope in the world. Even after more than a quarter of a century, the VLA exceeds all other radio astronomy facilities with its combination of sensitivity, flexibility, speed, and overall imaging quality. The VLA is currently being rebuilt as a new observatory, the Expanded Very Large Array (EVLA). The EVLA will provide a radio telescope of unprecedented sensitivity, resolution, and imaging capability, by modernizing and extending the existing Very Large Array. When completed, the EVLA will have sensitivity improvements of an order of magnitude, with frequency between 1.0 and 50 GHz, with up to 8 GHz bandwidth per polarization. The modifications are well over 50% complete, and early science with the VLA is expected in 2010.

==== Central Development Laboratory (CDL) ====
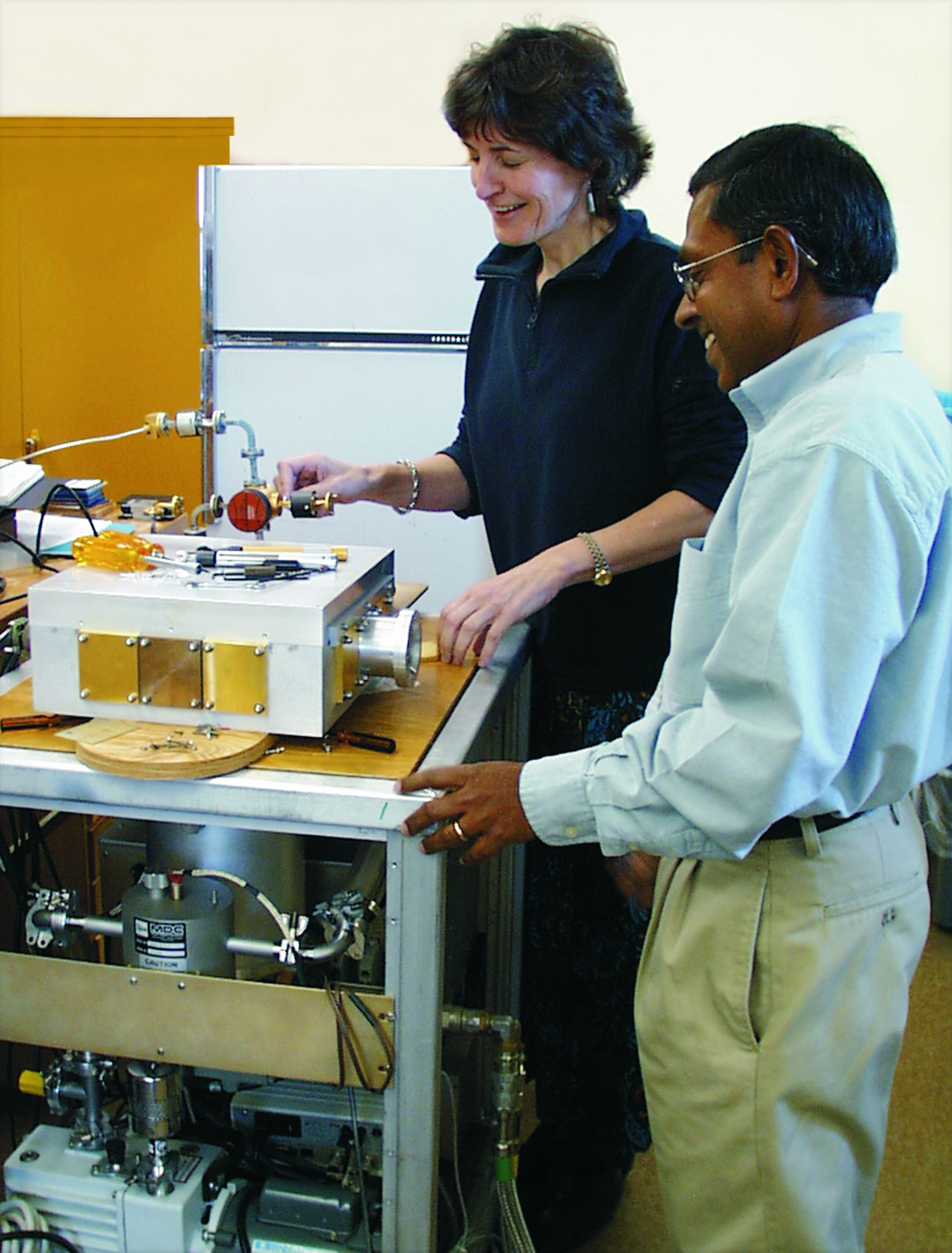
CDL

The mission of the CDL, headquartered in Charlottesville, Virginia, is to support the evolution of NRAO's existing facilities and provide the technology and expertise needed to build the next generation of radio astronomy instruments. This is accomplished through development of the enabling technologies: low noise amplifiers, millimeter and sub-millimeter detectors, optics and electromagnetic components including feeds and phased arrays, digital signal processing, and new receiver architectures. CDL staff have developed and produced these critical components and subsystems not only for NRAO's telescopes, but also for the worldwide astronomical community for ground and space-based instruments. Technical innovations developed or enhanced at the CDL have contributed to improvements in communications antennas, transistors, cryogenic coolers, medical and scientific imaging, time and frequency standards, atomic clocks, GPS navigation, 911 emergency call location, and precision spacecraft navigation. NRAO technology increases our understanding of the Universe and contributes to American competitiveness.

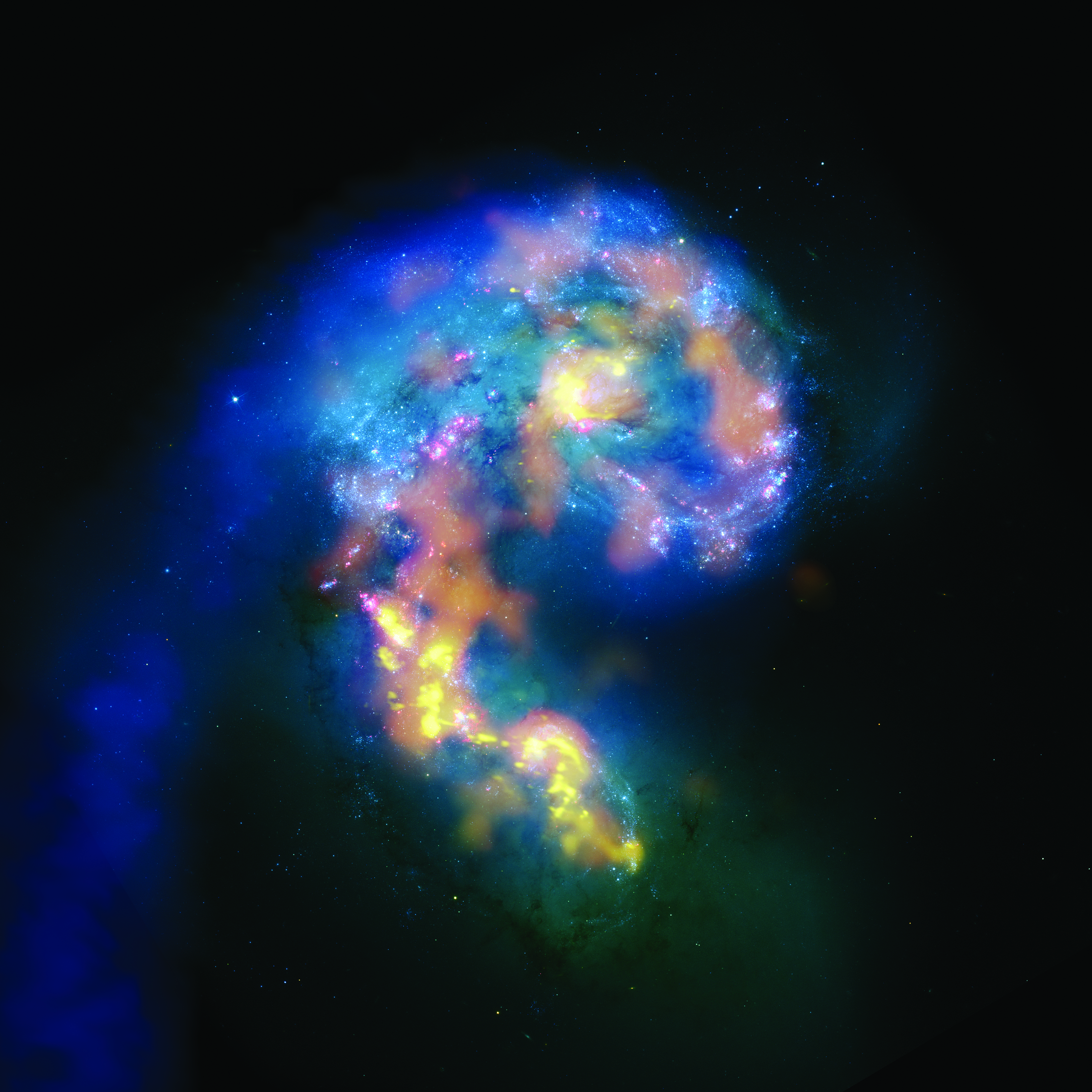
Composite image from ALMA and VLA data

==== The North American ALMA Science Center ====
North American ALMA Science Center in Charlottesville, Virginia, is the ALMA headquarters for North America. The NAASC supports ALMA science operations in Chile and provides user support for the North American community, including user website and proposal guides, proposal preparation, post-observation user support, data reduction "cookbooks," and organization of ALMA meetings/workshops.

==== Green Bank Observatory (GBO) ====
The Robert C. Byrd Green Bank Telescope is the world's largest fully steerable radio telescope. The 100-meter Green Bank Telescope (GBT) is located at the Green Bank Observatory in Green Bank, West Virginia, which is inside the National Radio Quiet Zone (NRQZ).

==== Long Baseline Observatory (LBO) ====
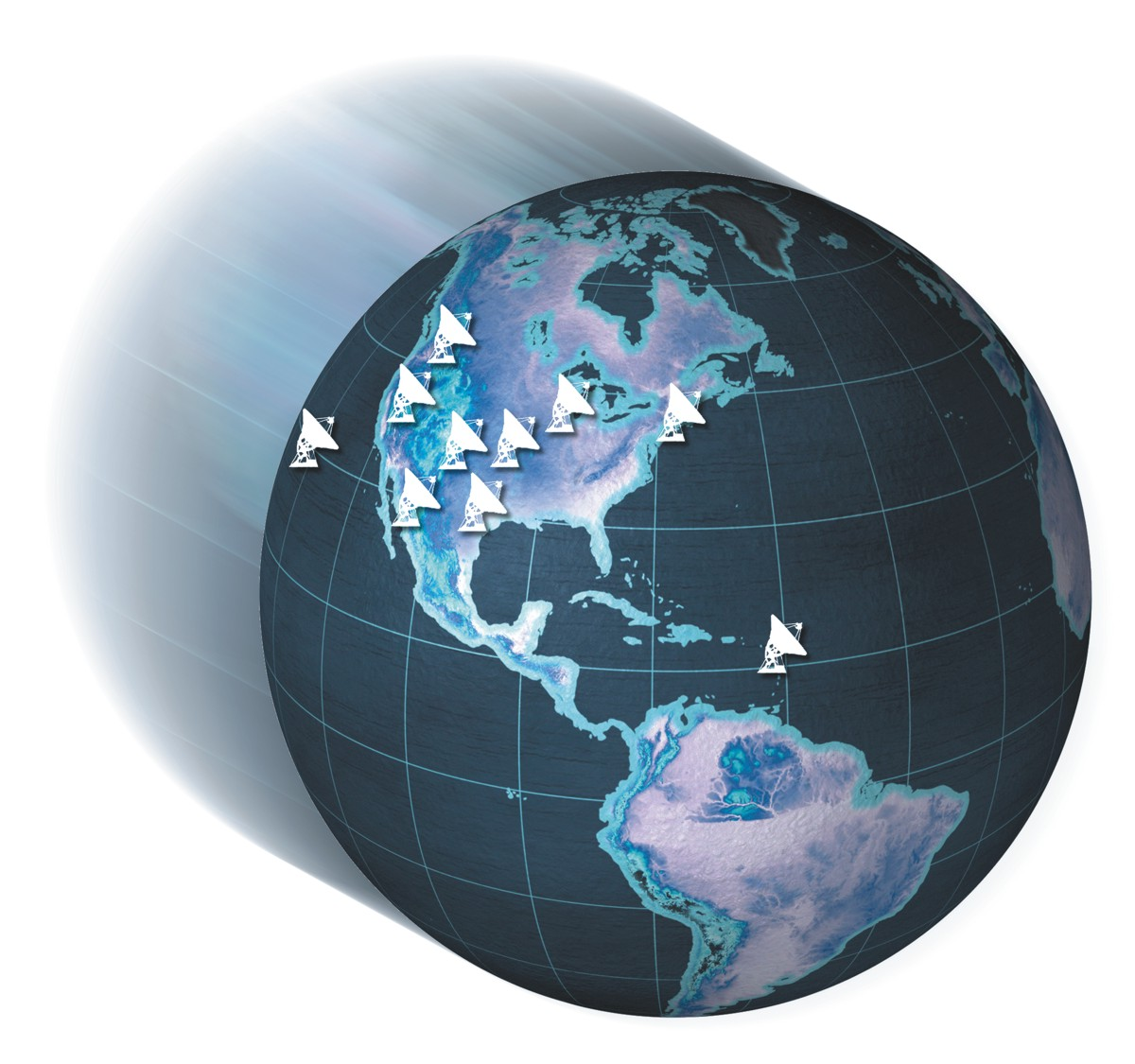
VLBA locations

The Very Long Baseline Array (VLBA) is a continent-wide radio telescope system offering the greatest resolving power of any astronomical instrument operational today. It is a system of ten identical 25-meter radio-telescope antennas, spread from St. Croix in the U.S. Virgin Islands, across the continental United States, to Mauna Kea, Hawaii, working together as a single instrument.

=== CCAT ===
AUI is helping a university-based team that is building a 6-meter, very wide field of view submillimeter telescope, taking advantage of a superb site adjacent to ALMA, at 5600 meters above sea level in the Atacama Desert in northern Chile. AUI strongly endorses the science potential of this telescope, currently named CCAT Prime (CCAT-p). AUI obtained the land concession for the site, helped develop the initial road design, and is helping the university group establish its own legal presence in Chile. The goal continues to be the creation of a next-generation submillimeter telescope combining high sensitivity, a wide field of view, and a broad wavelength range to provide an unprecedented capability for deep, large area multicolor submillimeter surveys.
