= SDSS J211852.96−073227.5 =

Narrow-line Seyfert galaxy located in the constellation of Aquarius

SDSS J211852.96-073227.5.
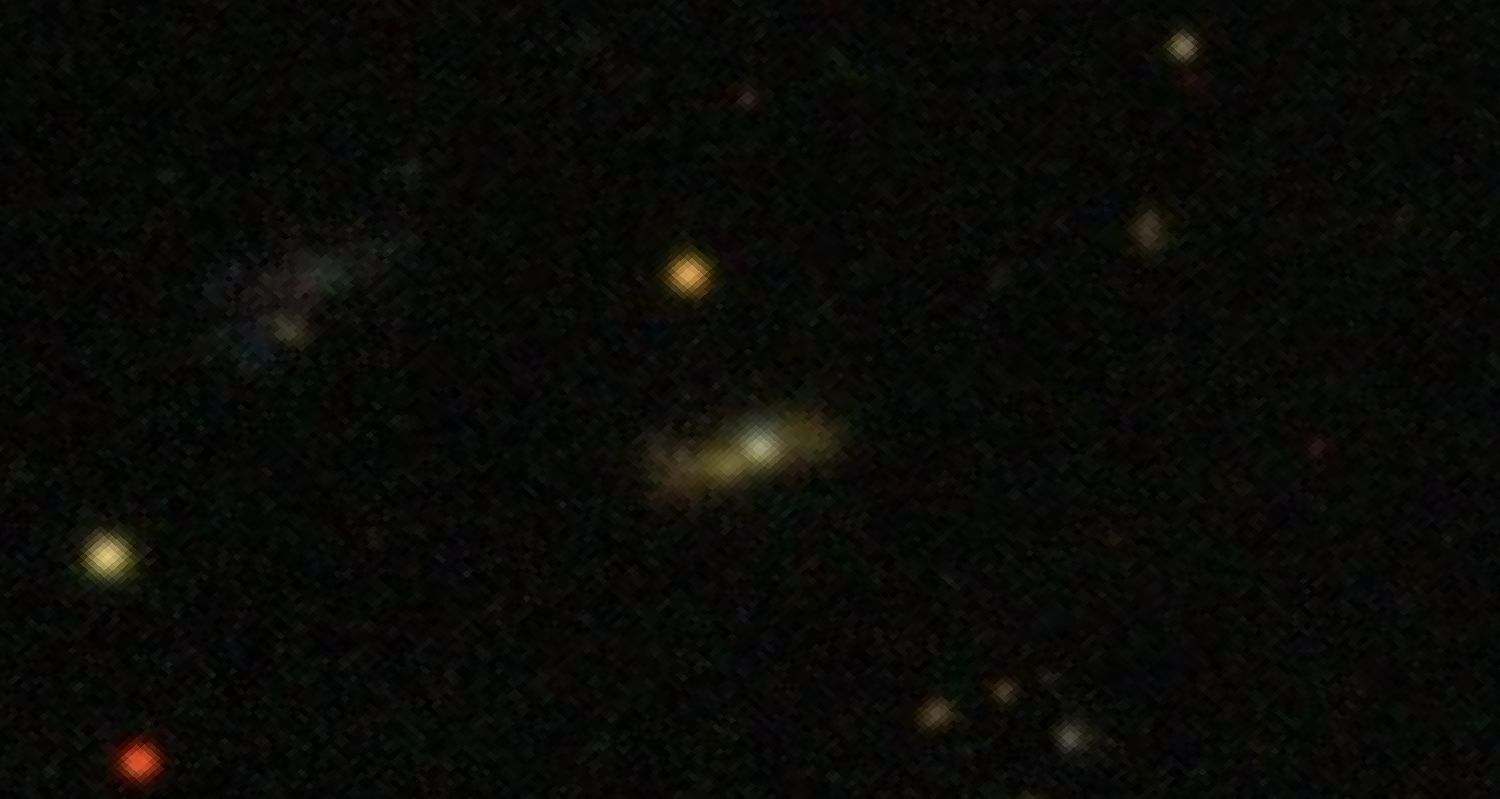
- The Narrow-line Seyfert galaxy SDSS J211852.96-073227.5

Observation data (J2000.0 epoch)
- Constellation: Aquarius
- Right ascension: 21^{h} 18^{m} 52.96^{s}
- Declination: −07° 32′ 27.60″
- Redshift: 0.260110
- Heliocentric radial velocity: 77,979 km/s
- Distance: 3.129 Gly

Characteristics
- Type: Candidate BLAGN
- Size: ~337,000 ly (103.2 kpc) (estimated)

Other designations
- 2MASS J21185296-0732275, IVS B2116-077, THING 587726877802758324, NVSS J211852-073229, TXS 2116-077, OCARS 2116-077 PGC 3431405

SDSS J211852.96−073227.5 is a narrow-line Seyfert galaxy with an active galactic nucleus located in the constellation of Aquarius. The redshift of the object is (z) 0.26 and it was first discovered in April 2018 by astronomers who categorized the object as gamma-ray emitting.

== Description ==
SDSS J211852.96−073227.5 is classified as a late stage galaxy merger involving two late-type galaxies. When imaged, it is found to have two clearly resolved nuclei that is separated from each other by 12 kiloparsecs. Further observations, showed the merging companion galaxy at the same redshift, has presence of emission lines in its optical spectrum, confirming it a Type 2 Seyfert galaxy. A ring of Hydrogen-alpha material is shown surrounding the main galaxy's nucleus, with a curved filament feature connecting both nuclei. The supermassive black hole mass of the primary galaxy is estimated to be 3 × 10^{7} M_{☉}. Young stellar population of stars mainly between 0.5 and 2.5 billion years old, are located mainly inside the inner region of the companion galaxy.

Imaging made with Very Long Baseline Array (VLBA), showed SDSS J211852.95−073227.5 has a complex radio structure. When imaged, it has a core-jet morphology with a radio core showing an inverted radio spectrum at high frequencies while at lower frequencies, the spectrum is steep. The core is also found variable given that variations are shown. There is evidence of an extended structure on parsec-scales imaged at 22 and 43 GHz frequencies based on imaging by VLBI Exploration of Radio Astrometry (VERA). A dark matter halo of material is surrounding the core region.

Further imaging, has found there is a radio jet emerging outwards from the galaxy. This has been suggested to be triggered during the merging process, given the fact its kinematic age is much younger compared to the beginning of the merger between 0.5 and 2 billion years ago. VLBA has shown the jet components are mainly weak with the entire jet being perpendicular towards the axis of the galaxy.
