= Very Large Array =

Radio astronomy observatory in New Mexico, US

Karl G. Jansky Very Large Array
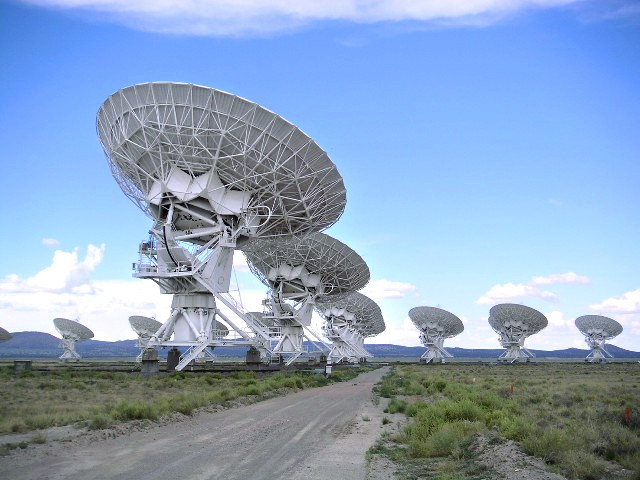
- Alternative names: VLA
- Location: Socorro County, New Mexico
- Coordinates: 34°04′43″N 107°37′04″W
- Altitude: 2,124 m (6,969 ft)
- Wavelength: 0.6 cm (50 GHz)–410 cm (73 MHz)
- Built: 1973–1981
- Website: science.nrao.edu/facilities/vla/
- Location within the United States
- Related media on Commons

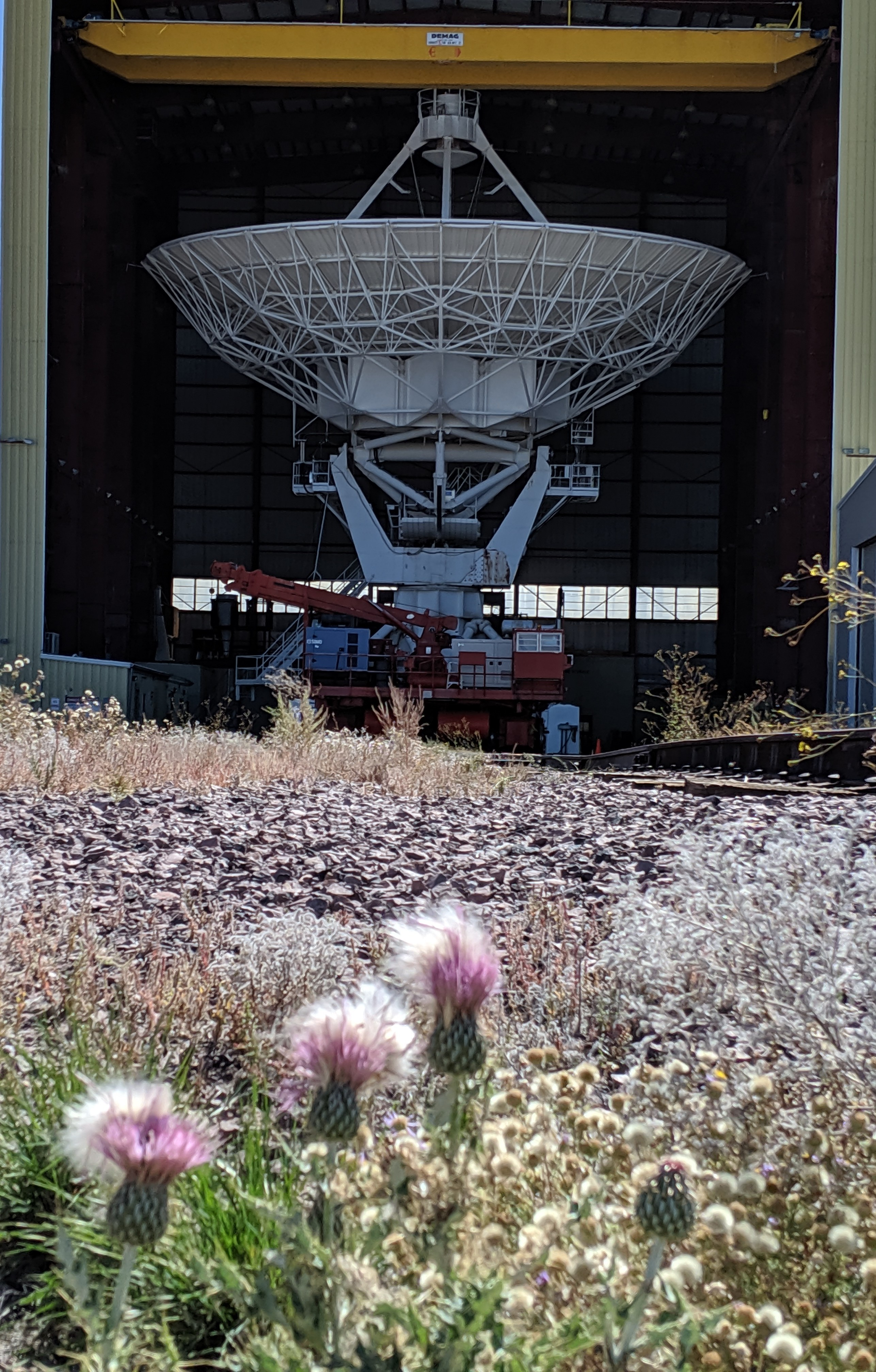
One of the 28 radio telescopes, seen here undergoing maintenance in "The Barn"

The Karl G. Jansky Very Large Array (VLA) is a centimeter-wavelength radio astronomy observatory in the southwestern United States built in the 1970s. It lies in central New Mexico on the Plains of San Agustin, between the towns of Magdalena and Datil, approximately 50 miles (80 km) west of Socorro. The VLA comprises 28 25-meter (82 ft) radio telescopes (27 of which are operational while one is always rotating through maintenance) deployed in a Y-shaped array and all the equipment, instrumentation, and computing power to function as an interferometer. Each of the massive telescopes is mounted on double parallel railroad tracks, so the radius and density of the array can be transformed to adjust the balance between its angular resolution and its surface brightness sensitivity. Astronomers using the VLA have made key observations of black holes and protoplanetary disks around young stars, discovered magnetic filaments and traced complex gas motions at the Milky Way's center, probed the Universe's cosmological parameters, and provided new knowledge about the physical mechanisms that produce radio emission.

The VLA stands at an elevation of 6,970 feet (2,120 m) above sea level. It is a component of the National Radio Astronomy Observatory (NRAO). The NRAO is a facility of the National Science Foundation operated under cooperative agreement by Associated Universities, Inc.

== Characteristics ==
The radio telescope comprises 27 independent antennas in use at a given time plus one spare, each of which has a dish diameter of 25 meters (82 feet) and weighs 209 metric tons (230 short tons). The antennas are distributed along the three arms of a track, shaped in a wye (or Y-shaped) configuration, each of arms measuring 21 kilometers (13 mi) long. Using the rail tracks that follow each of these arms—and that, at one point, intersect with U.S. Route 60 at a level crossing—and a specially designed lifting locomotive ("Hein's Trein"), the antennas can be physically relocated to a number of prepared positions, allowing aperture synthesis interferometry with up to 351 independent baselines: in essence, the array acts as a single antenna with a variable diameter. The angular resolution that can be reached is between 0.2 and 0.04 arcseconds.

There are four commonly used configurations, designated A (the largest) through D (the tightest, when all the dishes are within 600 meters (2,000 ft) of the center point). The observatory normally cycles through all the various possible configurations (including several hybrids) every 16 months; the antennas are moved every three to four months. Moves to smaller configurations are done in two stages, first shortening the east and west arms and later shortening the north arm. This allows for a short period of improved imaging of extremely northerly or southerly sources.

The frequency coverage is 74 MHz to 50 GHz (400 to 0.7 cm).

The Pete V. Domenici Science Operations Center (DSOC) for the VLA is located on the campus of the New Mexico Institute of Mining and Technology in Socorro, New Mexico. The DSOC also serves as the control center for the Very Long Baseline Array (VLBA), a VLBI array of ten 25-meter (82 ft) dishes located from Hawaii in the west to the U.S. Virgin Islands in the east that constitutes the world's largest dedicated, full-time astronomical instrument.

== Key science ==
The VLA is a multi-purpose instrument designed to allow investigations of many astronomical objects, including radio galaxies, quasars, pulsars, supernova remnants, gamma-ray bursts, radio-emitting stars, the sun and planets, astrophysical masers, black holes, and the hydrogen gas that constitutes a large portion of the Milky Way galaxy as well as external galaxies. In 1989 the VLA was used to receive radio communications from the Voyager 2 spacecraft as it flew by Neptune. A search of the galaxies M31 and M32 was conducted in December 2014 through January 2015 with the intent of quickly searching trillions of systems for extremely powerful signals from advanced civilizations.

It has been used to carry out several large surveys of radio sources, including the NRAO VLA Sky Survey and Faint Images of the Radio Sky at Twenty-Centimeters.

In September 2017 the VLA Sky Survey (VLASS) began. This survey will cover the entire sky visible to the VLA (80% of the Earth's sky) in three full scans. Astronomers expect to find about 10 million new objects with the survey – four times more than what is presently known.

== History ==
The driving force for the development of the VLA was David S. Heeschen. He is noted as having "sustained and guided the development of the best radio astronomy observatory in the world for sixteen years." Congressional approval for the VLA project was given in August 1972, and construction began some six months later. The first antenna was put into place in September 1975 and the complex was formally inaugurated in 1980, after a total investment of $78.5 million (equivalent to $257 million in 2025). It was the largest configuration of radio telescopes in the world.

In 1997 the VLA was featured in Contact, the film adaptation of the 1985 book by the same name written by Carl Sagan.

With a view to upgrading the venerable 1970s technology with which the VLA was built, the VLA has evolved into the Expanded Very Large Array (EVLA). Beginning in 2001, the upgrade has enhanced the instrument's sensitivity, frequency range, and resolution with the installation of new hardware at the San Agustin site. The project was completed on time and on budget in 2012. A second phase of this upgrade may add up to eight additional antennae in other parts of the state of New Mexico, up to 190 miles (300 km) away, if funded.

The decade-long EVLA upgrade project resulted in the VLA expanding its technical capacities by factors of up to 8,000. The 1970s-era electronics were replaced with state-of-the-art equipment. To reflect this increased capacity, VLA officials asked for input from both the scientific community and the public in coming up with a new name for the array, and near the completion of the EVLA project in January 2012 it was announced that the array would be renamed the "Karl G. Jansky Very Large Array". On March 31, 2012, the VLA was officially renamed in a ceremony inside the Antenna Assembly Building.

Starting in 2018, the VLA routinely operates with the nearby Long Wavelength Array to form the ELWA.

=== ngVLA upgrade ===
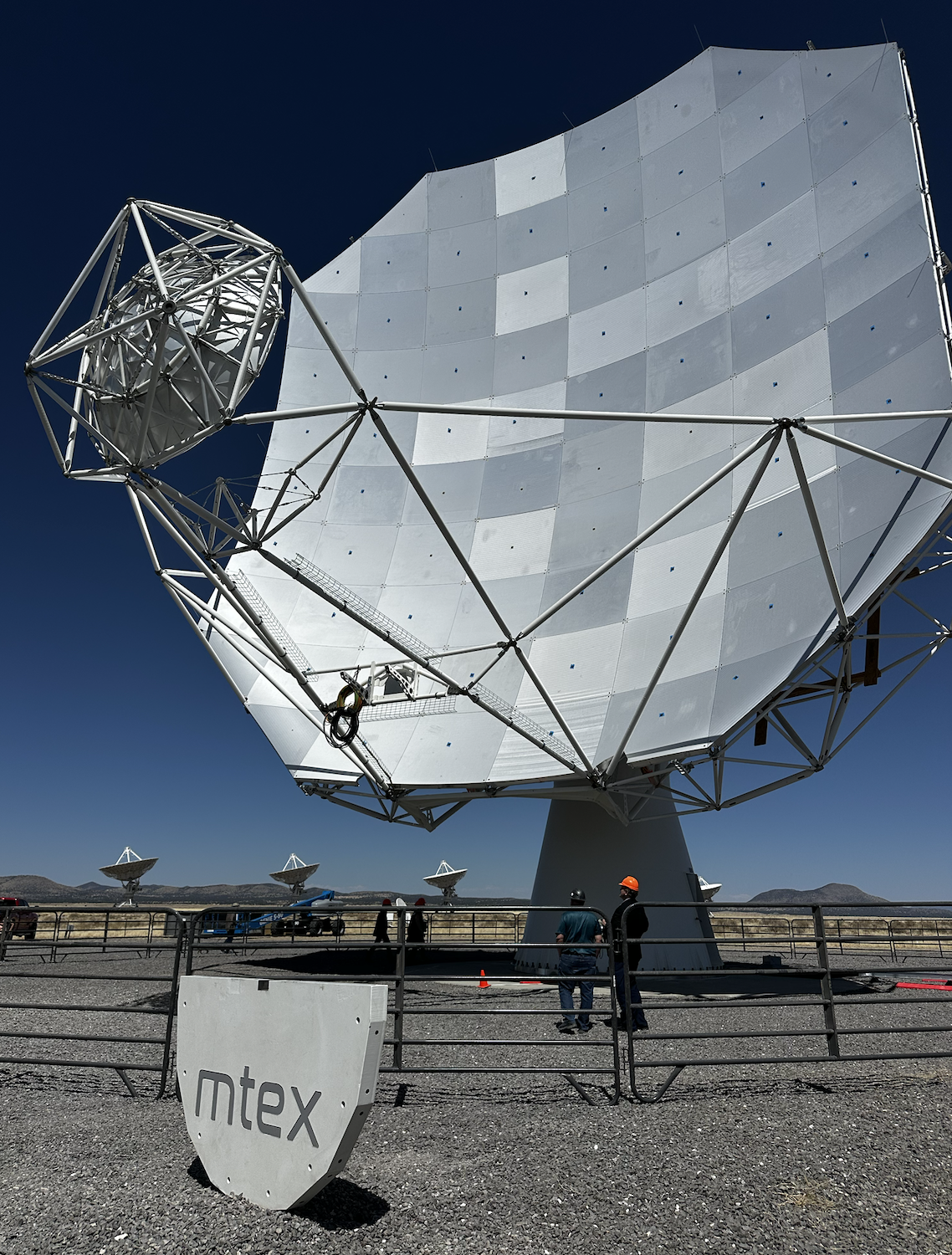
The ngVLA prototype antenna during the handover ceremony, with the older antennae in the background.

In June 2023, the National Radio Astronomy Observatory announced that they will be replacing the ageing antennae with 160 new ones at the site, plus 100 auxiliary antennae located across North America. The project, estimated to cost about $2 billion to build and around $90 million to run, will vastly expand the capabilities of the current installation and increase the frequency sensitivity from 50 GHz to over 100 GHz. The facility will be renamed the Next Generation Very Large Array (ngVLA).

Upgrading to the ngVLA will begin in late 2028 and early science operation will begin in mid 2031. This upgrade will replace the old antennae with more than 260 new antennae. These will be 18 meters in diameter and have three configurations:

- Short baseline array (SBA) is a dense core within about 1 kilometer (1 mi) that includes 19 close-packed antennae with 6-meter (20 ft) diameter. It might be combined with four 18-meter (59 ft) antennae located in New Mexico.
- Main Interferometric Array: 214 antennae of 18-meter (59 ft), reaching a baseline of about 1000 km. The antennae will be arranged in a dense core and spiral arms. Located in New Mexico, west Texas, eastern Arizona, and northern Mexico.
- Long Baseline Array (LBA): An additional 30 antennae with 18-meter (59 ft) diameter of continental scale. Originally stations in Hawaii, Washington, California, Iowa, West Virginia, New Hampshire, Puerto Rico, the US Virgin Islands, and Canada, but now also includes a station in Germany.

The ngVLA will be ten times more sensitive than the old VLA and ten times more sensitive than ALMA. It will operate at 1.2–116 GHz. A prototype antenna was produced by the German company mtex antenna technology in Schkeuditz, Saxony and panels made by CONCAD in Walldürn. The prototype dish was installed on its pedestal on February 6, 2025.

A project led by the University of Würzburg will build the Wetterstein Millimeter Telescope (WMT) on top of the Zugspitze, near the Schneefernerhaus. The new radio telescope will be part of the ngVLA, as the German contribution to the ngVLA. The WMT will also be able to do observations on its own.

== Tourism ==
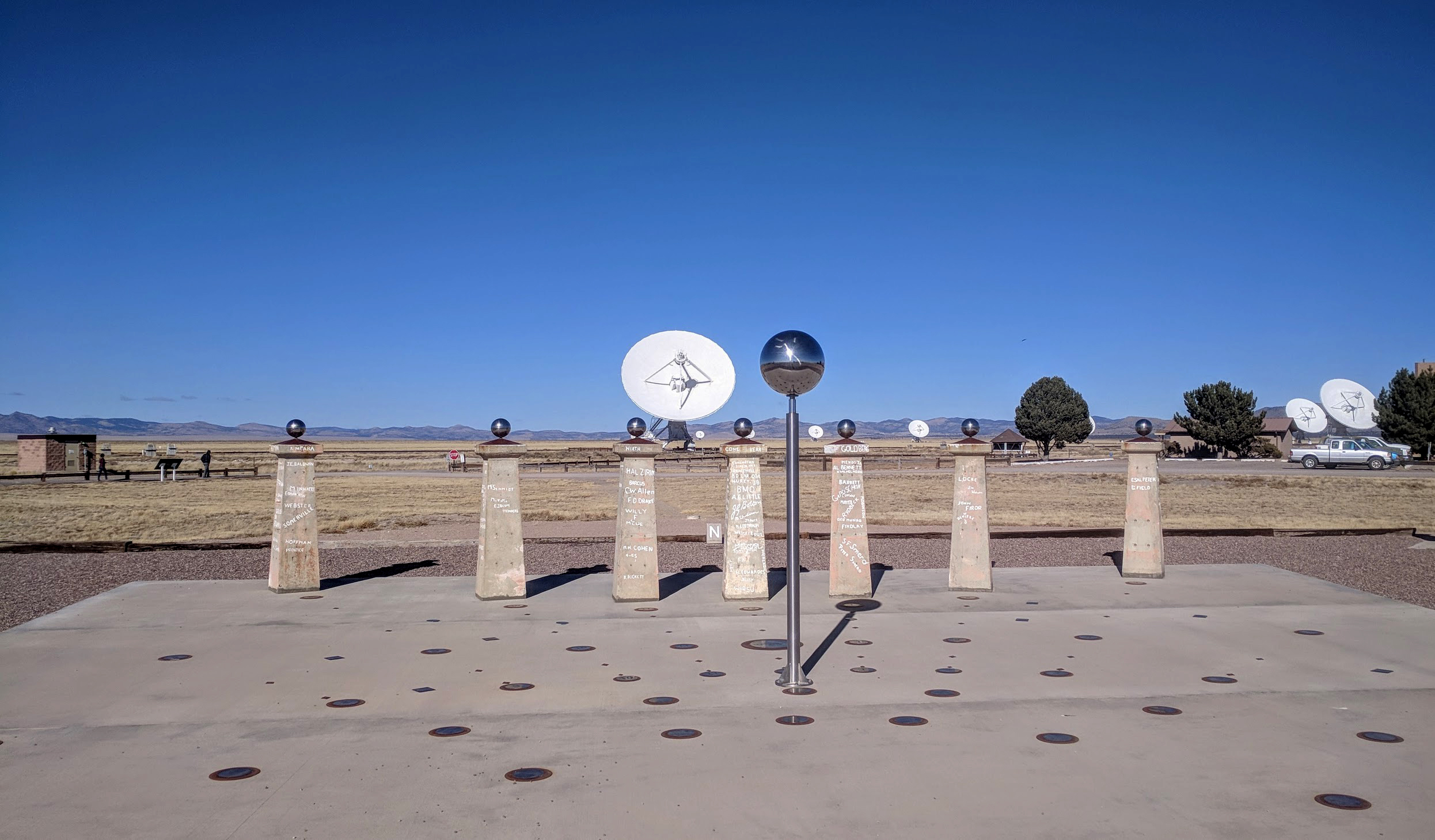
The Bracewell Radio Sundial on the VLA walking tour, seen from the south. Named for Ronald N. Bracewell, this sundial marks on the ground positions of the shadow of the central sphere (the gnomon) at different times of day and times of year. The shadow on Dec 22, 2017 falls very near the winter solstice line and the 1:00 PM (solar time) mark. The other two lines of markers north of the gnomon are for the equinoxes and the summer solstice. Additional lines of markers south of the gnomon mark positions of "shadows" of the radio sources Cygnus A and Cassiopeia A. The posts at the back of the sundial were recovered from Bracewell's radio telescope array at Stanford University, abandoned in 1980, where they had been signed by visitors with chisels at his invitation.

The VLA is located between the towns of Magdalena and Datil, about 50 miles (80 km) west of Socorro, New Mexico. U.S. Route 60 passes east–west through the complex.

The VLA site is open to visitors with paid admission. A visitor center houses a small museum, theater, and a gift shop. A self-guided walking tour is available, as the visitor center is not staffed continuously. Visitors unfamiliar with the area are warned that there is little food on site, or in the sparsely populated surroundings; those unfamiliar with the high desert are warned that the weather is quite variable, and can remain cold into April. For those who cannot travel to the site, the NRAO created a virtual tour of the VLA called the VLA Explorer.

The VLA site was previously closed to visitors from March 2020 through October 2022.

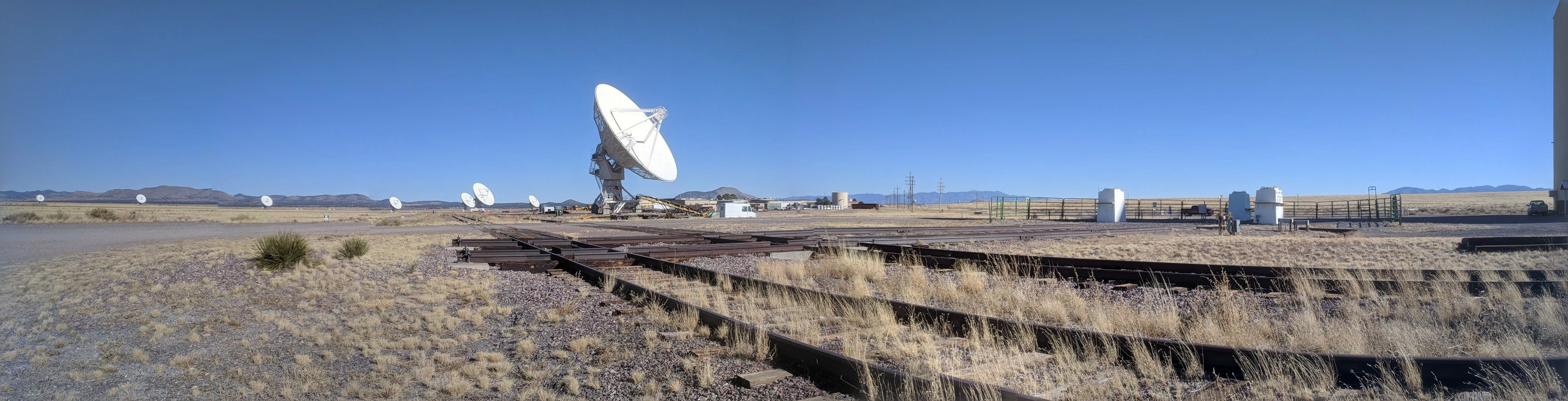
The cross rail track structure of the VLA, including an empty antenna mount station on the right (the three concrete piers that the antenna's triangular base mounts to)

== See also ==
- Magdalena Ridge Observatory, about 25 miles (40 km) southeast of the VLA; run by VLA collaborator New Mexico Tech.
- Allen Telescope Array (ATA)
- Atacama Large Millimeter Array (ALMA)
- Green Bank Telescope (GBT)
- Lake San Agustín, which once stood where the VLA is now
- List of radio telescopes
- Square Kilometre Array (SKA)
- Very-long-baseline interferometry (VLBI)
- Very Small Array (VSA)
