= National Radio Astronomy Observatory =

Federally funded research and development center for radio astronomy

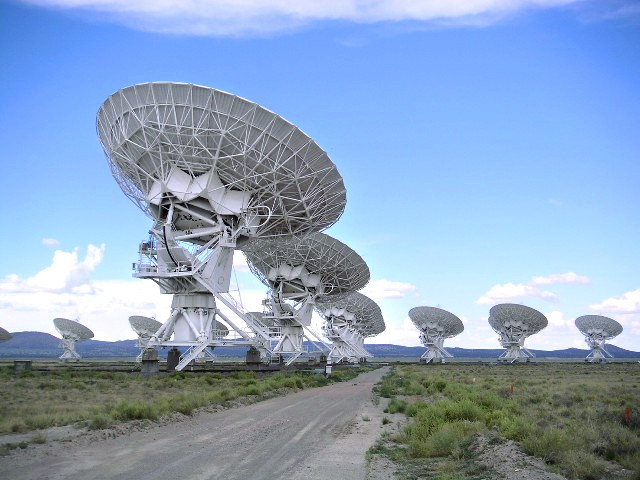
- Alternative names: NRAO
- Organization: Associated Universities, Inc.
- Location: United States
- Coordinates: 38°02′12″N 78°31′05″W
- Established: 1959
- Website: public.nrao.edu
- Telescopes: Atacama Large Millimeter Array; Green Bank Interferometer; Green Bank Telescope; Very Large Array; Very Long Baseline Array
- Related media on Commons

The National Radio Astronomy Observatory (NRAO) is since 1956 a federally funded research and development center of the United States National Science Foundation operated under cooperative agreement by Associated Universities, Inc. for the purpose of radio astronomy. NRAO designs, builds, and operates its own high-sensitivity radio telescopes for use by scientists around the world.

== Locations ==
=== Charlottesville, Virginia ===
The NRAO headquarters is located on the campus of the University of Virginia in Charlottesville, Virginia. The North American ALMA Science Center and the NRAO Technology Center and Central Development Laboratory are also in Charlottesville.

=== Green Bank, West Virginia ===
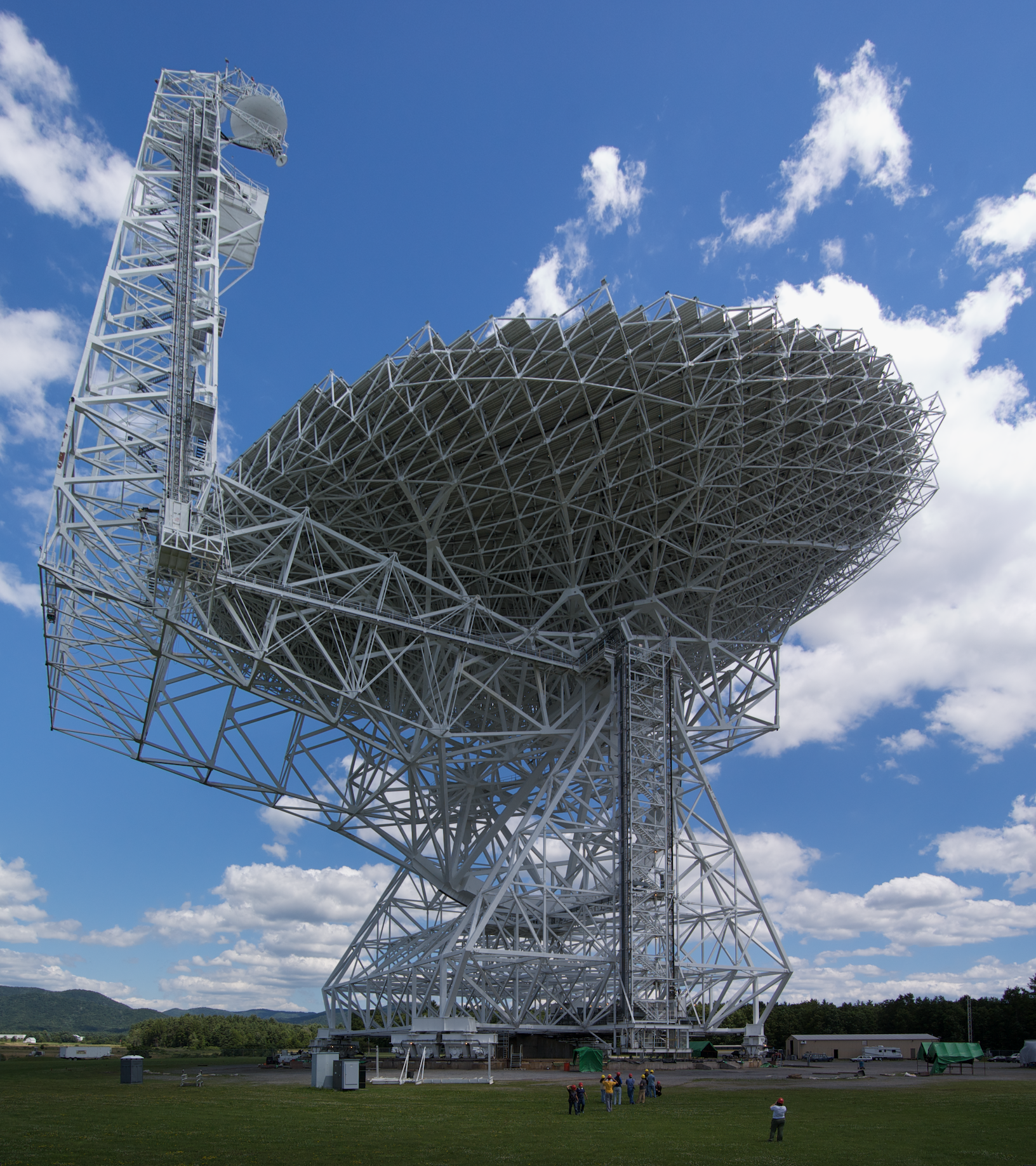
The 100-meter Green Bank Telescope

NRAO was, until October 2016, the operator of the world's largest fully steerable radio telescope, the Robert C. Byrd Green Bank Telescope, which stands near Green Bank, West Virginia. The observatory contains several other telescopes, among them the 140-foot (43 m) telescope that utilizes an equatorial mount uncommon for radio telescopes, three 85-foot (26 m) telescopes forming the Green Bank Interferometer, a 40-foot (12 m) telescope used by school groups and organizations for small scale research, a fixed radio "horn" built to observe the radio source Cassiopeia A, as well as a reproduction of the original antenna built by Karl Jansky while he worked for Bell Labs to detect the interference that was discovered to be previously unknown natural radio waves emitted by the universe.

Green Bank is in the National Radio Quiet Zone, which is coordinated by NRAO for protection of the Green Bank site as well as the Sugar Grove Station monitoring site operated by the NSA. The zone consists of a 13,000-square-mile (34,000 km^{2}) piece of land where fixed transmitters must coordinate their emissions before a license is granted. The land was set aside by the Federal Communications Commission in 1958. No fixed radio transmitters are allowed within the area closest to the telescope. All other fixed radio transmitters including TV and radio towers inside the zone are required to transmit such that interference at the antennas is minimized by methods including limited power and using highly directional antennas. With the advent of Wireless technology and microprocessors in everything from cameras to cars, it is difficult to keep the sites free of radio interference. To aid in limiting outside interference, the area surrounding the Green Bank Observatory was at one time planted with pines characterized by needles of a certain length to block electromagnetic interference at the wavelengths used by the observatory. At one point, the observatory faced the problem of North American flying squirrels tagged with United States Fish and Wildlife Service telemetry transmitters. Electric fences, electric blankets, faulty automobile electronics, and other radio wave emitters have caused great trouble for the astronomers in Green Bank. All vehicles on the premises are powered by diesel motors to minimize interference by ignition systems.

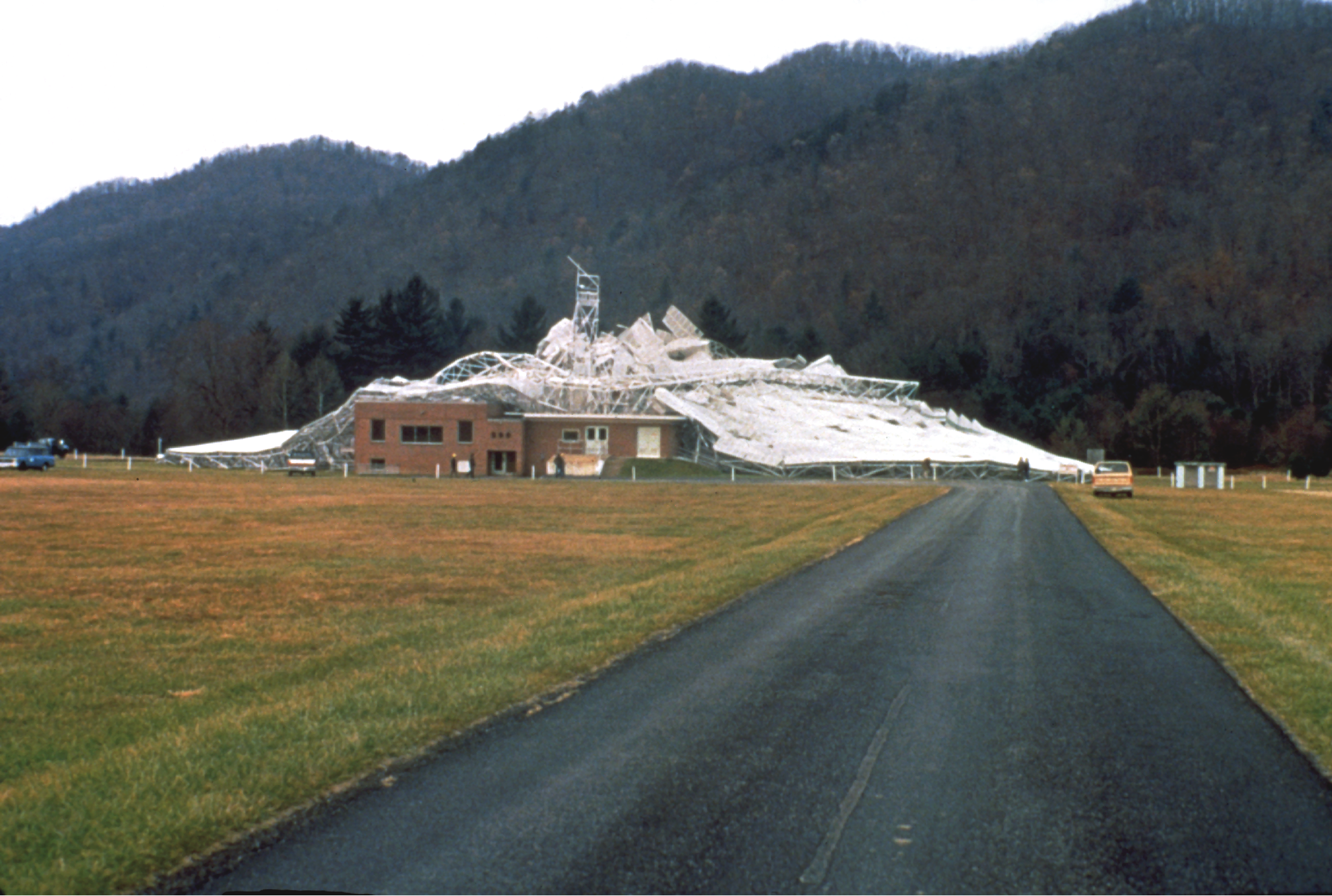
The 300-foot telescope after collapsing on November 15th, 1988

Until its collapse on November 15, 1988, a 300 ft radio telescope stood at the Green Bank Observatory's unique site. It was the largest radio telescope on Earth when it was brought online for its first observation at 12:42 am on September 21, 1962. The telescope's first observation was of the remnants of Tycho's supernova that had exploded 11 November 1572. Two major overhauls installed a new surface in 1970 to correct for maintenance, snow damage, and warping from its sheer size; then a new, bigger project building was constructed in 1972 that incorporated a Faraday cage around the control room itself. The telescope stood at 240 ft in height, weighed 600 tons, had a 2-minute arc accuracy, and had a surface accuracy of ~1 inch. The collapse in 1988 was found to be due to unanticipated stresses which cracked a hidden, yet weight- and stress-supporting steel connector plate, in the support structure of the massive telescope. A cascade failure of the structure occurred at 9:43 pm, causing the entire telescope to implode. The debris from the collapse was cleared by June 1989, and West Virginia Senator Robert C. Byrd led a campaign in Congress to replace it with the Green Bank Telescope, construction for which began in 1990.

=== Socorro, New Mexico ===
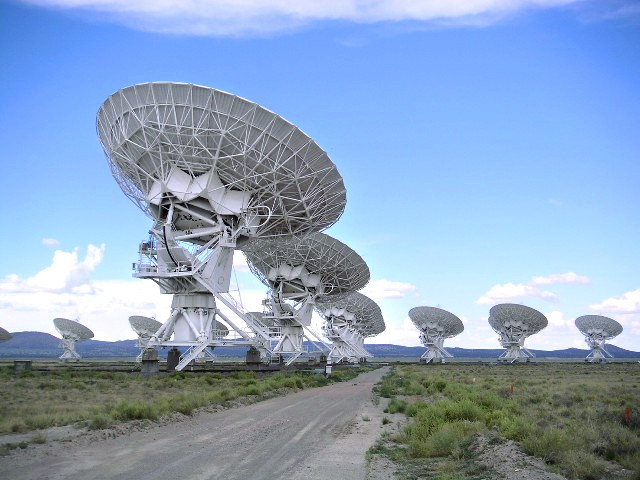
The Very Large Array (VLA), an array of 27 dish antennas

The NRAO's facility in Socorro is the Pete Domenici Array Operations Center (AOC). Located on the New Mexico Tech university campus, the AOC serves as the headquarters for the Very Large Array (VLA), which was the setting for the 1997 movie Contact, and is also the control center for the Very Long Baseline Array (VLBA). The ten VLBA telescopes are in Hawaii, the U.S. Virgin Islands, and eight other sites across the continental United States.

The ELWA system, commissioned in 2018, is also partially managed by the NRAO in association with the Long Wavelength Array (LWA) management. The ELWA array is formed with two LWA arrays and the VLA, observing at low frequencies with a center frequency of 76MHz..

=== Tucson, Arizona ===
Offices were located on the University of Arizona campus. NRAO formerly operated the 12-Meter Telescope on Kitt Peak. NRAO suspended operations at this telescope and funding was rerouted to the Atacama Large Millimeter Array (ALMA) instead. The Arizona Radio Observatory now operates the 12-Meter Telescope.

=== San Pedro de Atacama, Chile ===
The Atacama Large Millimeter Array (ALMA) site in Chile is at ~5,000 m (16,000 ft) altitude near Cerro Chajnantor in northern Chile. This is about 40 km (25 miles) east of the historic village of San Pedro de Atacama, 130 km (81 miles) southeast of the mining town of Calama, and about 275 km (171 miles) east-northeast of the coastal port of Antofagasta.

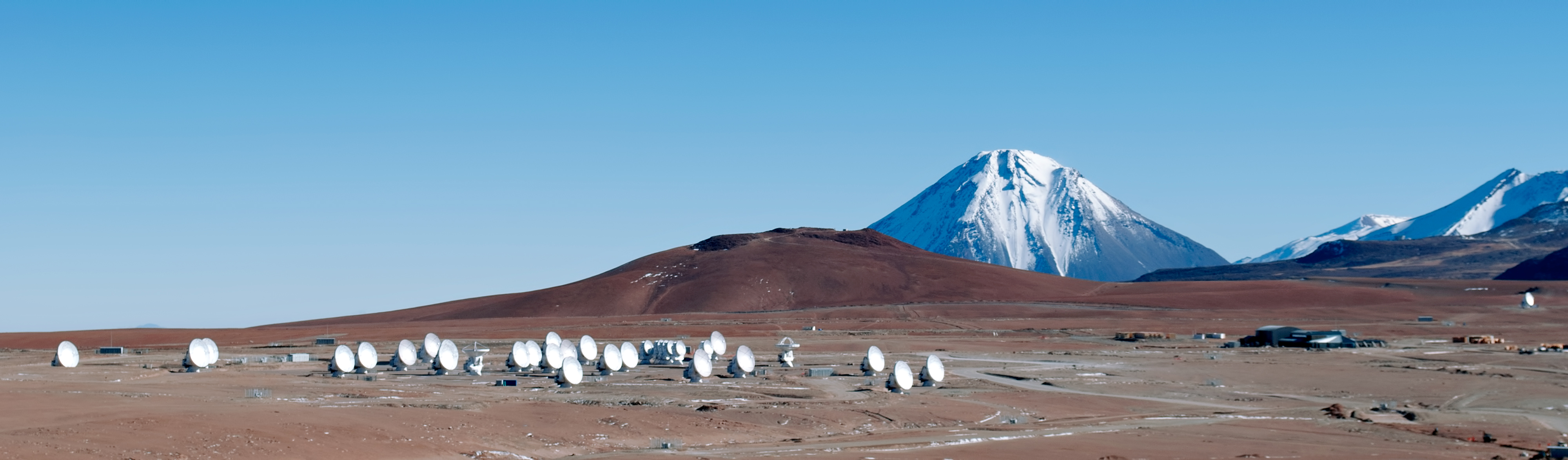
On 12 May 2012, another Atacama Large Millimeter/submillimeter Array (ALMA) antenna was carried up to the 5,000-metre plateau of Chajnantor, bringing the total on the plateau to 33.

== Directors ==
- 1959 - 1962: Otto Struve
- 1962 - 1978: David S. Heeschen
- 1978 - 1984: Morton S. Roberts
- 1984 - 1985: Hein Hvatum
- 1985 - 2002: Paul A. Vanden Bout
- 2002 - 2012: Fred K.Y. Lo
- 2012 - present: Anthony Beasley

== Jansky Prize ==
The Karl G. Jansky Lectureship is a prestigious lecture awarded by the board of trustees of the NRAO. The Lectureship is awarded "to recognize outstanding contributions to the advancement of radio astronomy". Recipients have included Fred Hoyle, Charles Townes, Edward M. Purcell, Subrahmanyan Chandrasekhar, Philip Morrison, Vera Rubin, Jocelyn Bell Burnell, Frank J. Low, and Mark Reid. The lecture is delivered in Charlottesville, Green Bank, and in Socorro.

== See also ==
- List of astronomical observatories
- National Optical Astronomy Observatory
