= Array Operations Center =

- Interactive map of the Array Operations Center area

General information
- Type: Science
- Location: Socorro, New Mexico, United States
- Coordinates: 34°04′10″N 106°54′26″W
- Owner: NRAO

Technical details
- Floor count: 3

The Array Operations Center (AOC) in Socorro, New Mexico, is the control and monitor center for the Very Long Baseline Array. From the AOC, National Radio Astronomy Observatory operators are able to remotely control and monitor the ten VLBA telescope stations over the internet. The operators aim the antennas, select radio frequencies for observation, control the hard drives, and monitor the weather and 'health' of the equipment at every site. A real-time display of the array's status is available for observers to also monitor their observations.

The VLBA's digital correlator is also housed in the AOC. When the hard drives from the telescopes' last observation are brought to the AOC, the supercalculator combines them into a merged dataset, creating the mathematical equivalent of a single, giant telescope's observation.

The AOC is a component of the National Radio Astronomy Observatory and is located inside the NRAO's Pete V. Domenici Science Operations Center on the campus of the New Mexico Institute of Mining and Technology.
