= Green Bank Telescope =

Radio telescope in Green Bank, WV, US

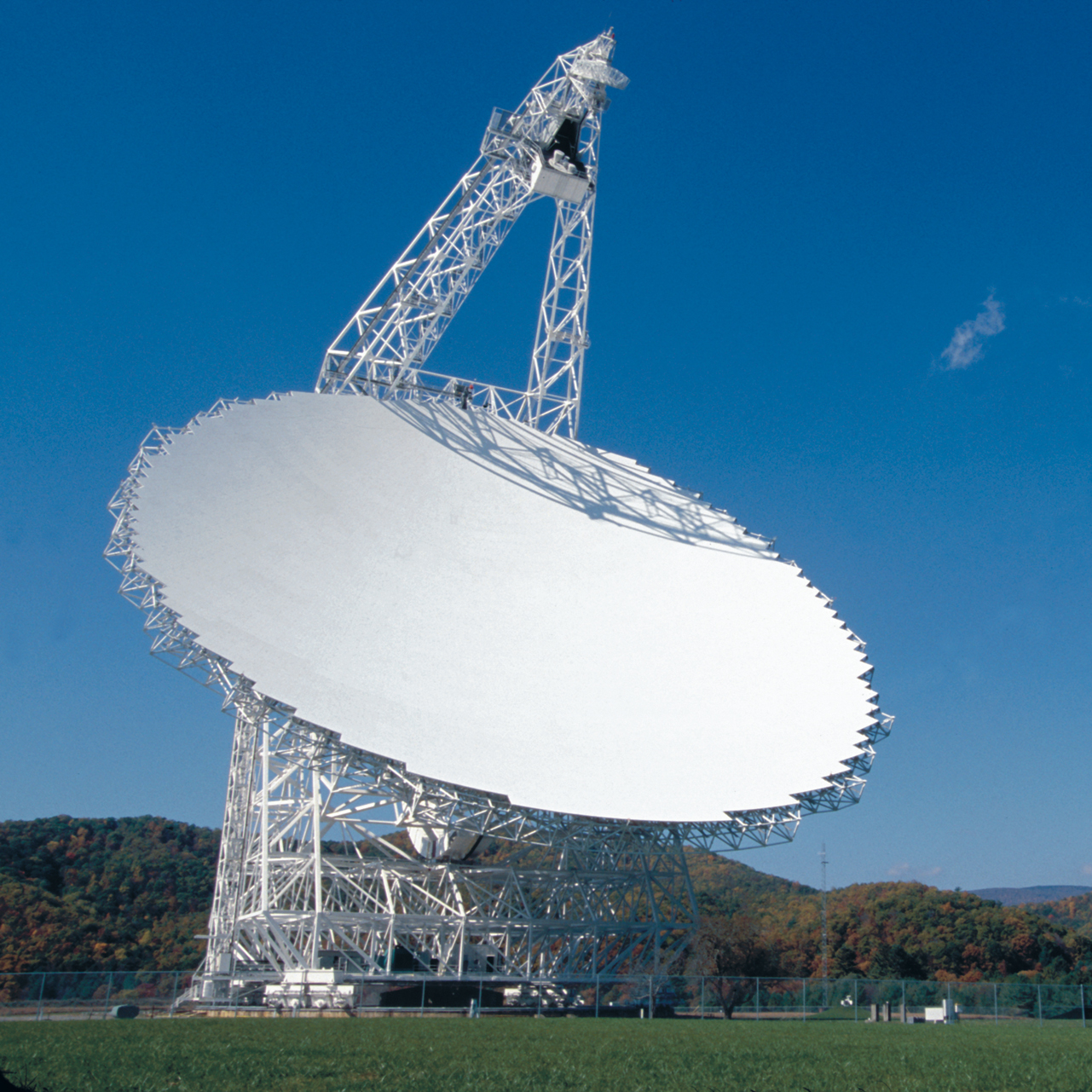
- The Green Bank Telescope
- Alternative names: GBT
- Named after: Robert Byrd
- Part of: Green Bank Observatory
- Location: Green Bank, United States National Radio Quiet Zone, Pocahontas County, United States
- Coordinates: 38°25′59″N 79°50′23″W
- Organization: Green Bank Observatory; National Radio Astronomy Observatory
- Observing time: 365 nights per year
- Built: 1990–2000
- First light: 23 August 2000
- Telescope style: radio telescope
- Diameter: 100 m (328 ft 1 in)
- Collecting area: 2.34 acres (102,000 sq ft)
- Focal length: 60 m (196 ft 10 in)
- Website: greenbankobservatory.org/science/telescopes/gbt/
- Location within the United States
- Related media on Commons

The Robert C. Byrd Green Bank Telescope (GBT) in Green Bank, West Virginia, US is the world's largest fully steerable radio telescope, surpassing the Effelsberg 100-m Radio Telescope in Germany. The Green Bank site was part of the National Radio Astronomy Observatory (NRAO) until September 30, 2016. Since October 1, 2016, the telescope has been operated by the independent Green Bank Observatory. The telescope's name honors the late Senator Robert C. Byrd who represented West Virginia and who pushed the funding of the telescope through Congress.

The Green Bank Telescope operates at meter to millimeter wavelengths. Its 100-meter-diameter collecting area, unblocked aperture, and good surface accuracy provide superb sensitivity across the telescope's full 0.1–116 GHz operating range. The GBT is fully steerable, and 85 percent of the local celestial hemisphere is accessible. It is used for astronomy about 6500 hours out of the 8760 hours in a year, with 2000–3000 hours per year going to high-frequency science.

Part of the scientific strength of the GBT is its flexibility and ease of use, allowing for rapid response to new scientific ideas and phenomena. It is scheduled dynamically to match project needs to the available weather. The GBT is also readily reconfigured with new and experimental hardware.

The high-sensitivity mapping capability of the GBT makes it a vital complement to the Atacama Large Millimeter Array, the Expanded Very Large Array, the Very Long Baseline Array, and other high-angular-resolution interferometers. Facilities of the Green Bank Observatory are also used for other scientific research, for many programs in education and public outreach, and for training students and teachers.

The telescope began regular science operations in 2001, making it one of the newest astronomical facilities of the US National Science Foundation (NSF). It was constructed following the collapse of a previous telescope at Green Bank, the 300 Foot Radio Telescope, a 90.44 m paraboloid that began observations in October 1961. This previous telescope collapsed on 15 November 1988 due to the failure of a gusset plate in the box girder assembly, which was a key component for the structural integrity of the telescope.

== Location ==
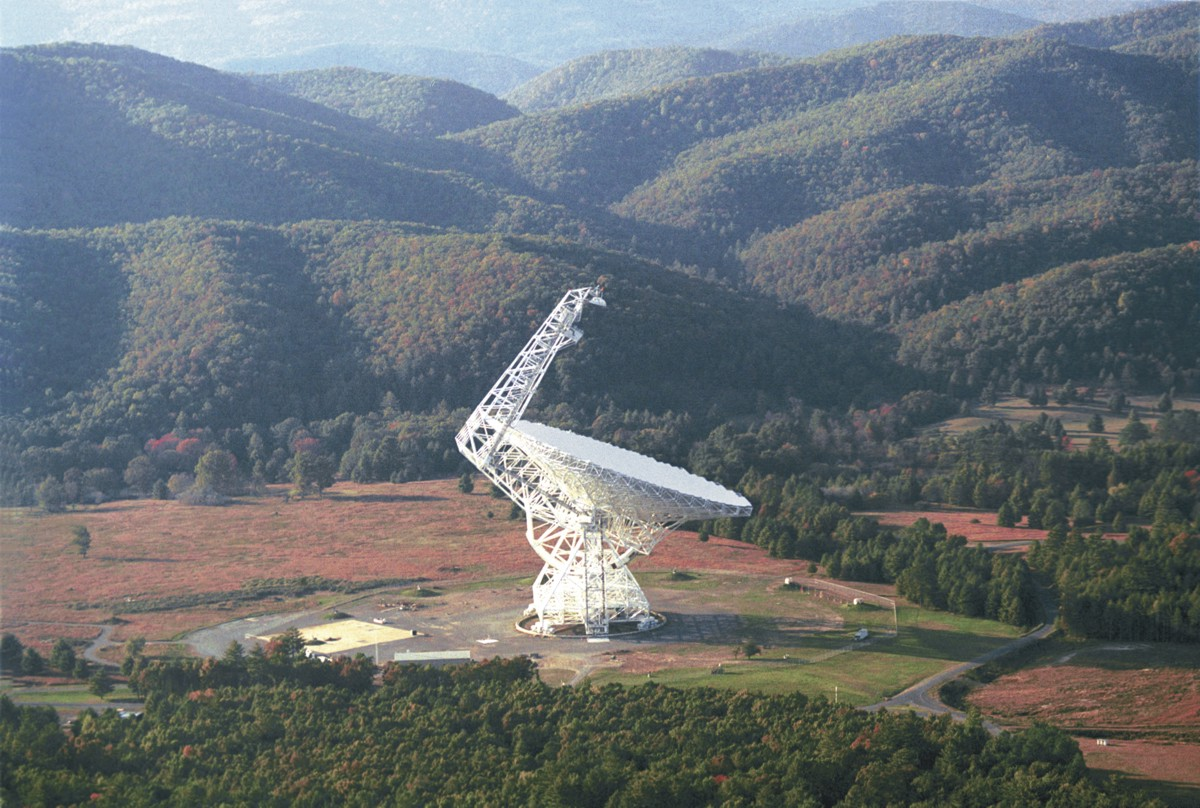
The Robert C. Byrd Green Bank Radio Telescope (GBT) has a collecting area of 2.3 acres (0.93 ha) which focuses the radio waves falling on it onto sensitive receivers at the top of the boom attached to the side.

The telescope sits near the heart of the United States National Radio Quiet Zone, a unique area located in the town of Green Bank, West Virginia, where authorities limit all radio transmissions to avoid emissions toward the GBT and the Sugar Grove Station. The location of the telescope within the Radio Quiet Zone allows for the detection of faint radio-frequency signals which human-made signals might otherwise mask. The observatory borders National Forest land, and the Allegheny Mountains shield it from some radio interference.

The telescope's location has been the site of important radio astronomy telescopes since 1957. It currently houses seven additional telescopes, and in spite of its somewhat remote location, receives about 40,000 visitors each year.

== Description ==
The structure weighs 7,600 metric tons (8,400 short tons) and is 485 feet (148 m) tall. The surface area of the GBT is a 100-by-110-meter active surface with 2,209 actuators (small motors used to adjust the position) for the 2,004 surface panels, making the total collecting area of 2.3 acres (9,300 m^{2}). The panels are made from aluminum manufactured to a surface accuracy of better than 50 micrometres (0.0020 in) RMS. The actuators adjust the panel positions to compensate for sagging, or bending under its own weight, which changes as the telescope moves. Without this so-called "active surface" adjustment, observations at frequencies above 4 GHz would not be as efficient.

Unusual for a radio telescope, the primary reflector is an off-axis segment of a paraboloid. This is the same design used in smaller (eg., 45–100 cm) home satellite television dishes. The asymmetric reflector allows the telescope's focal point and feed horn to be located at the side of the dish, so that it and its retractable support boom do not obstruct the incoming radio waves, as occurs in conventional radio telescope designs with the feed located on the telescope's beam axis.

The 200-foot (61 m) offset support arm houses a prime focus receiver on a retractable boom in front of a subreflector, and a receiver room. For prime focus operation, the boom is extended to position the feed horn in front of the 8 m subreflector. For Gregorian focus operation, the prime focus boom is retracted. The subreflector, positioned by a Stewart platform with 6 degrees of freedom, reflects incoming radio waves toward eight higher-frequency feeds on a rotating turret located on top of the receiver room. The computerized controlled turret can rotate a particular receiver into the position within a few minutes. Operational frequencies range from 290 MHz to 115 GHz.

As an azimuth-elevation mounting telescope, the azimuth adjustments are driven by four trucks with four wheels each on a 210-foot (64 m) diameter rail. The 16 thirty-horsepower motors can change azimuth at the rate of up to 40 degrees per minute. Azimuth axis is also supported by a pintle bearing at the center point of the azimuth track.

The elevation wheel structure provides tilting capability to adjust elevations between 5 and 95 degrees. The 98-foot (30 m) radius bull gear on the elevation wheel is driven by eight 40 horsepower motors with a capability of changing the elevations up to 20 degrees per minute. The 98-foot (30 m) long and 8-foot (2.4 m) diameter elevation shaft provides primary support of the wheel structure. The elevation wheel also contains concrete-filled counterweight to balance with the surface and the feed arm structure.

Green Bank Telescope components

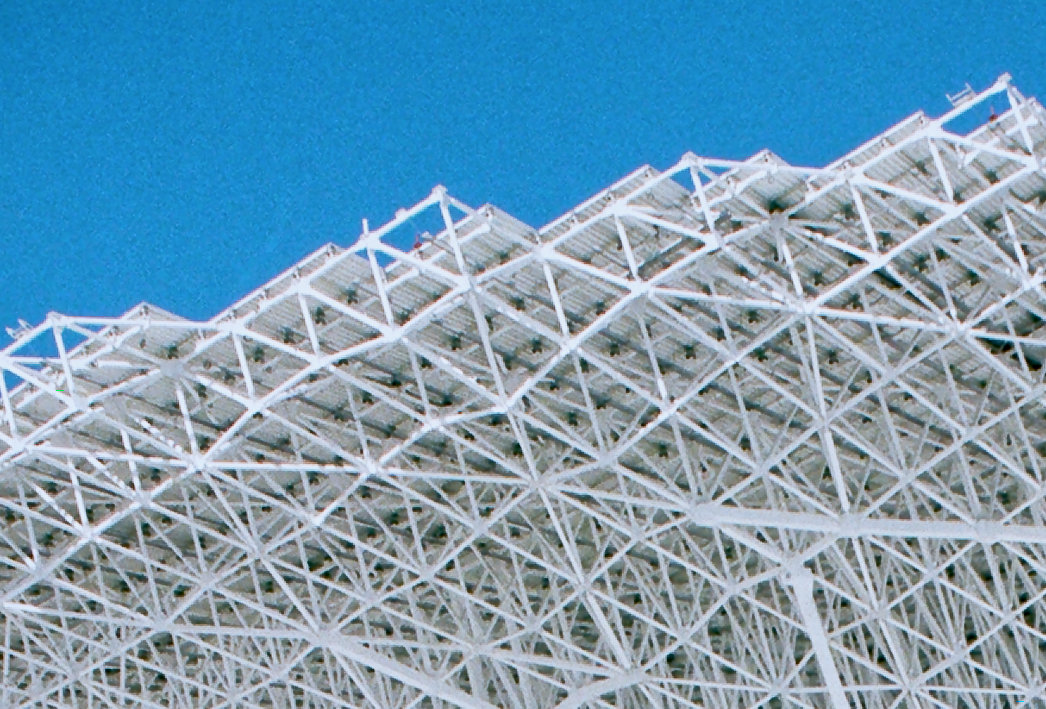
Actuators (black) under the surface panels for surface fine-tuning

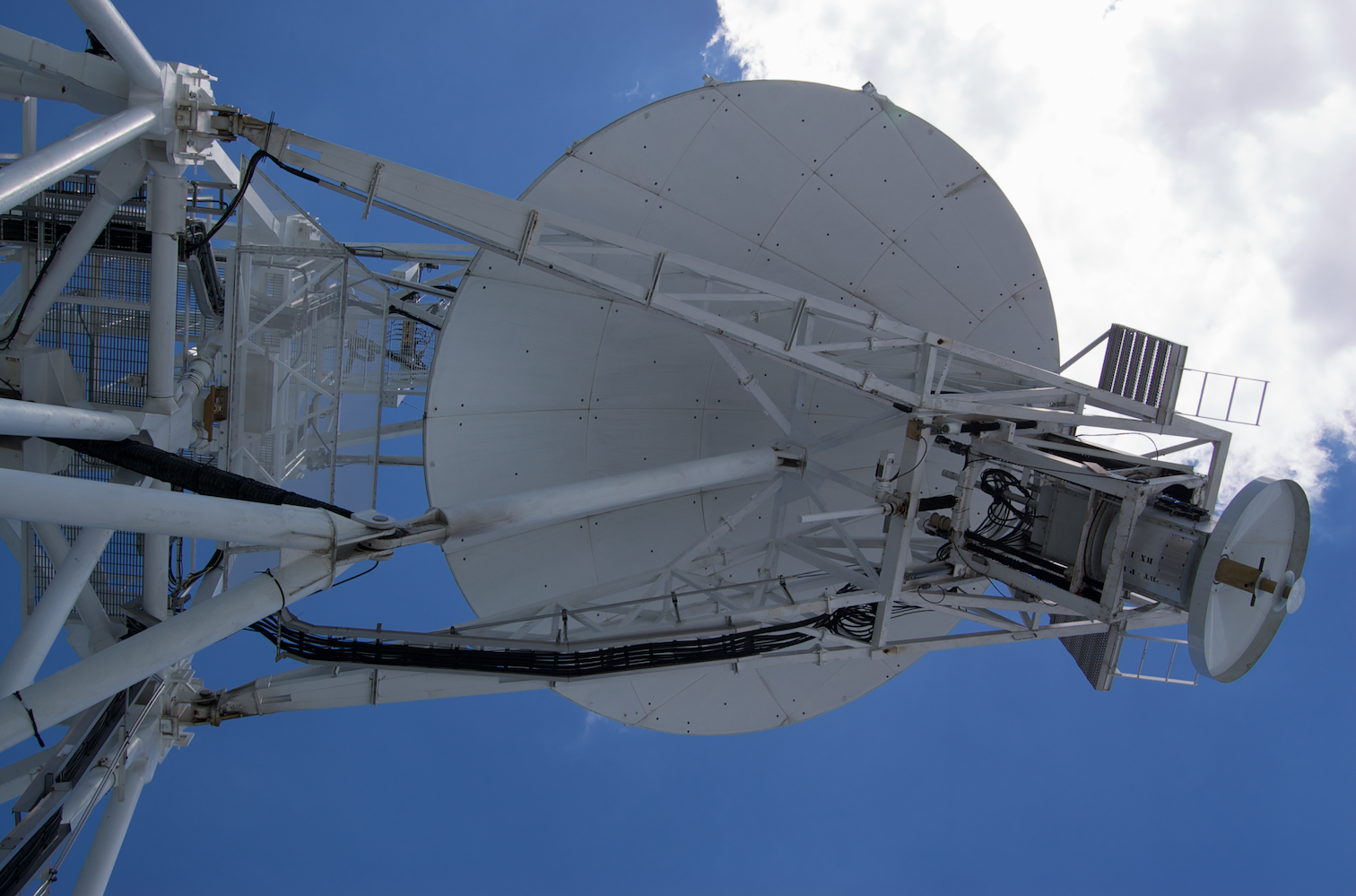
Prime focus receiver enclosed in a cage at the end of the extended boom

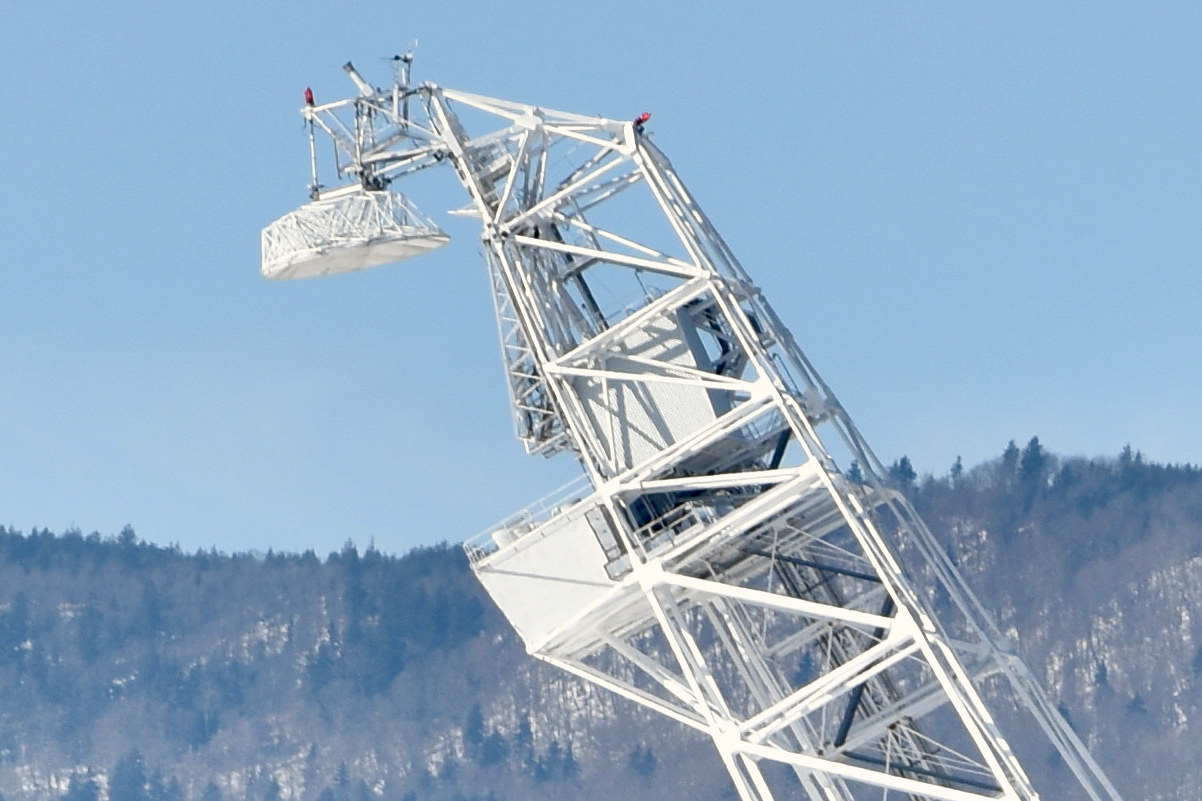
Gregorian focus operation: subreflector (top), rectracted boom (middle), and receiver turret (bottom)

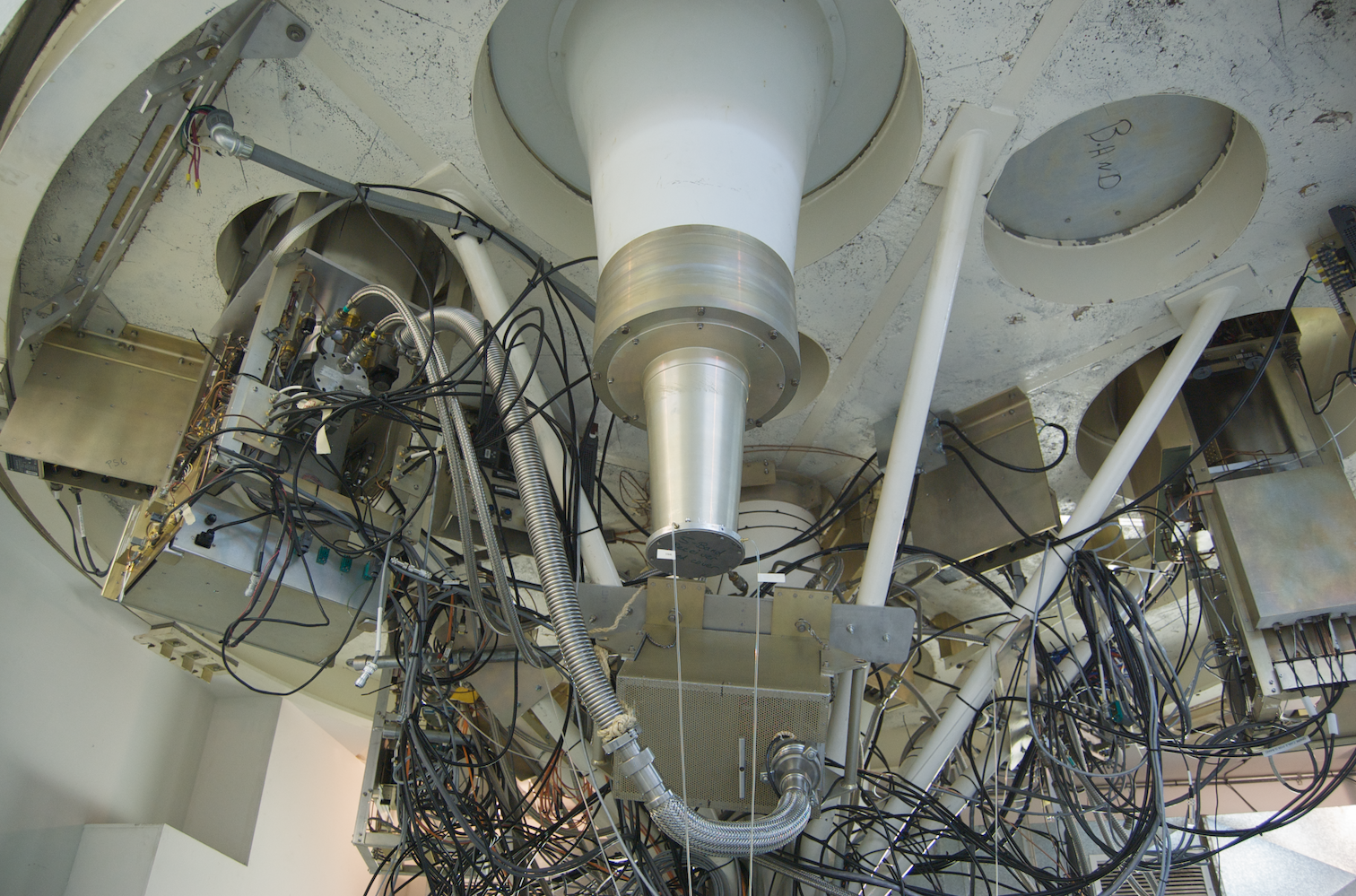
Underside of the turret inside the receiver room

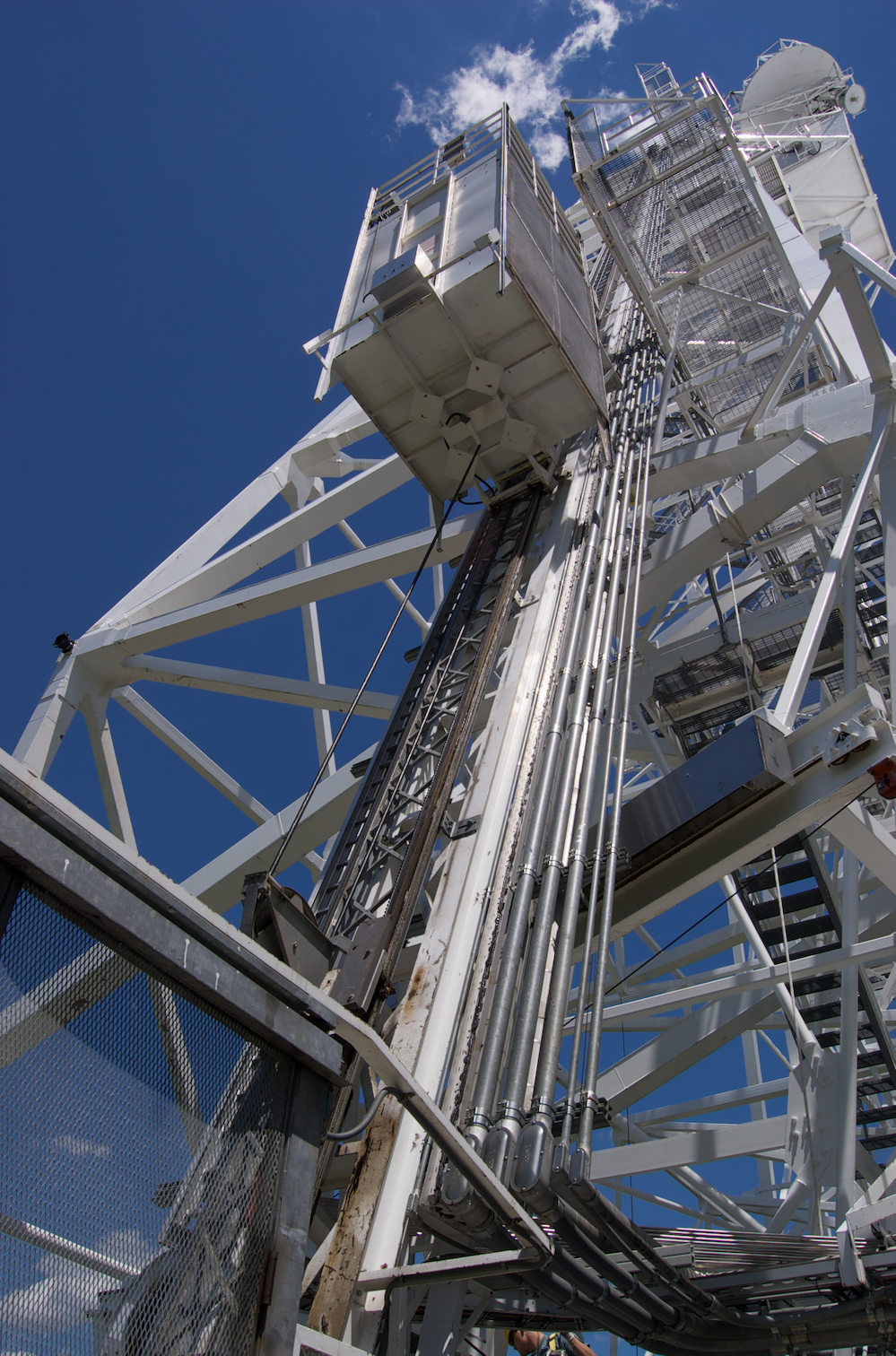
Access way to focal point

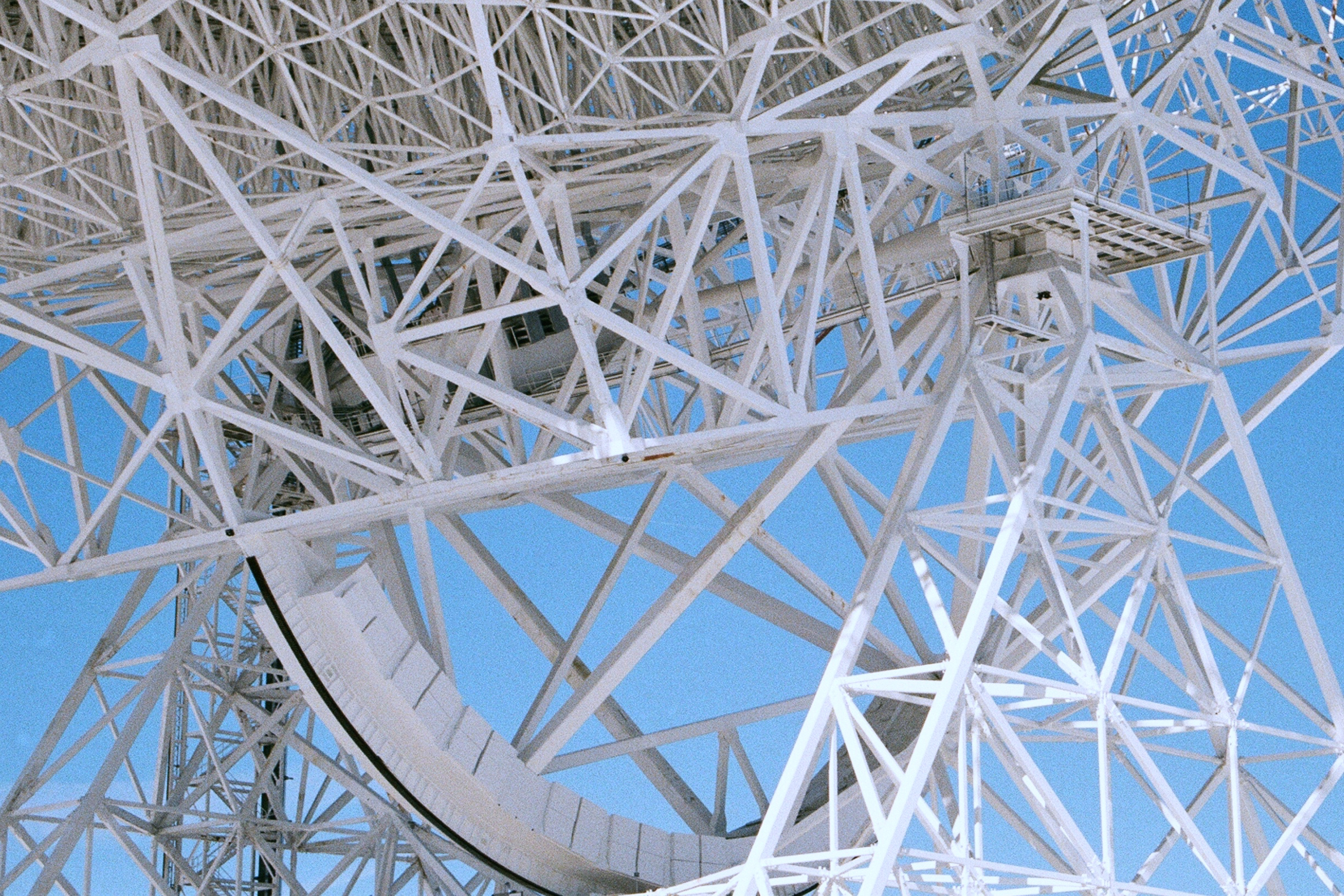
Elevation wheel with counterweight and bull gear (bottom), and elevation shaft (across from left to right)

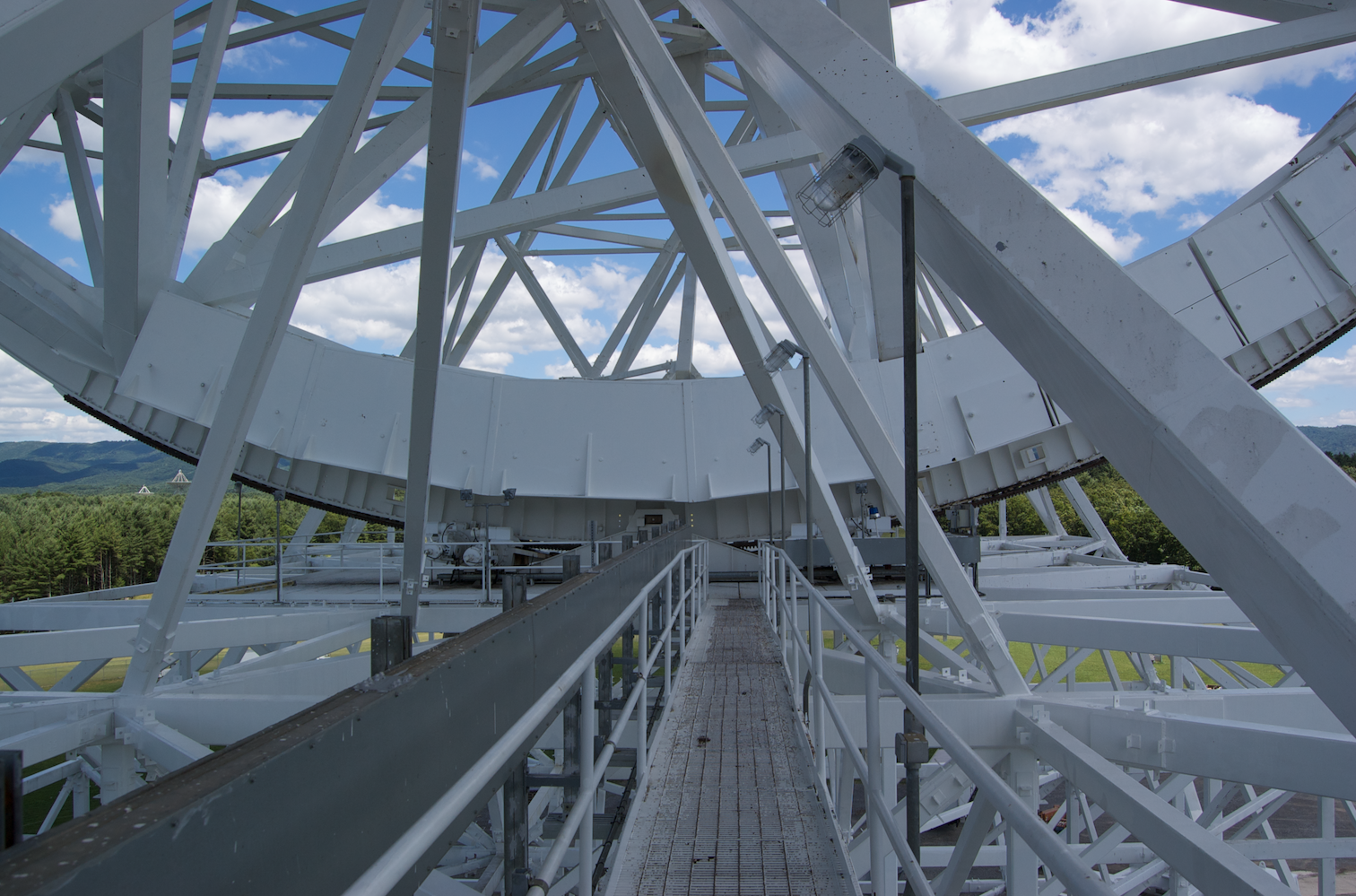
Elevation drive

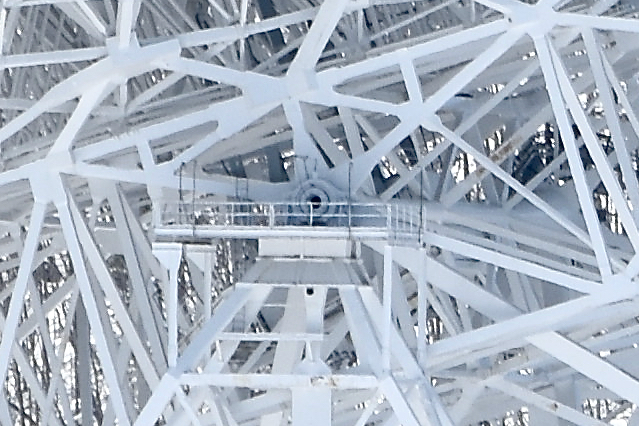
Elevation bearing (center)

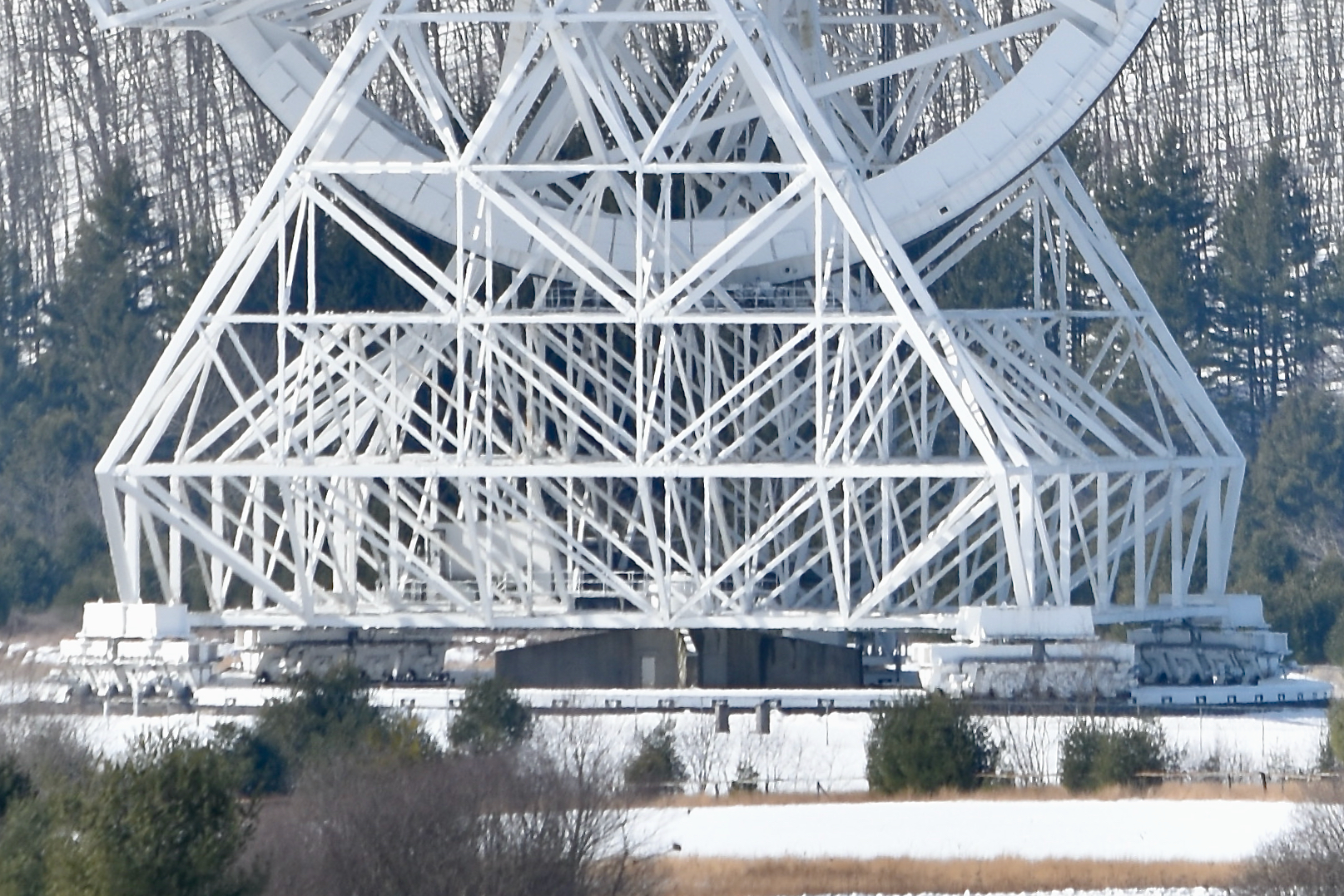
Four azimuth trucks (on the circular track) and pintle bearing (bottom center)

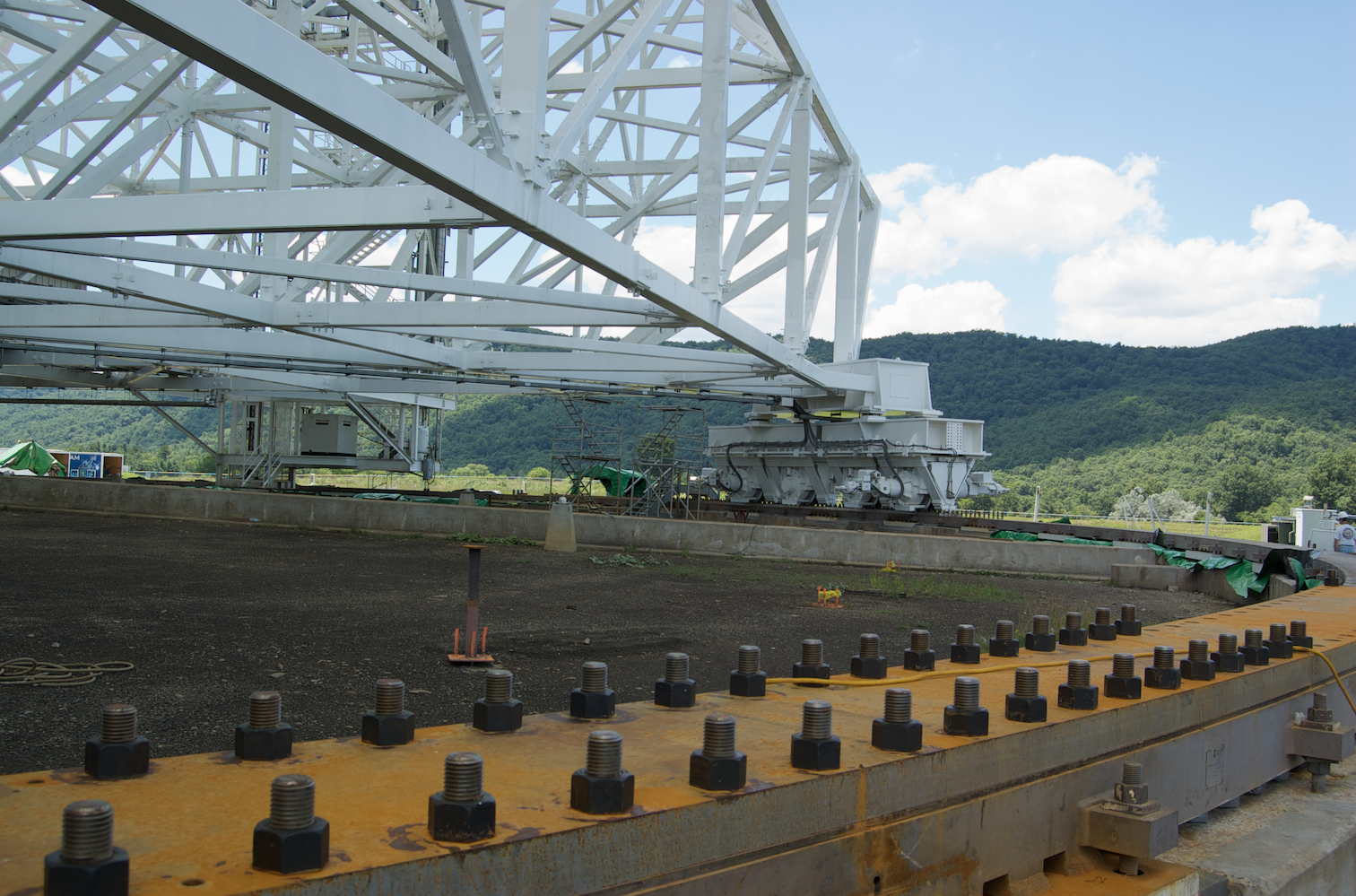
Azimuth truck and track

Because of its height (at 148 meters or 485 feet tall, it is 60% taller than the Statue of Liberty) and bulk (16 million pounds), locals sometimes refer to the GBT as the “Great Big Thing”.

The telescope's capabilities include the ngRADAR system which use the dish as a radar transmitting antenna to observe solar system objects such as asteroids. Its low power prototype (700 watts at Ku band), with reception at the Very Long Baseline Array, has already imaged the moon and asteroid (231937) 2001 FO32.

== Discoveries ==
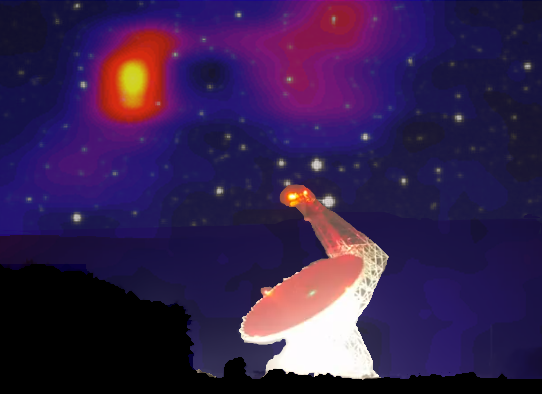
Composite image of a spectral line observation of star forming region W51, showing the distribution of ammonia in the region. The image of the telescope from a time lapse film of a night of observations

In 2002, astronomers detected three new millisecond pulsars in the globular cluster Messier 62.

In 2006, several discoveries were announced, including a large coil-shaped magnetic field in the Orion molecular cloud, and a large hydrogen gas superbubble 23,000 light years away, named the Ophiuchus Superbubble.

In 2019, the most massive neutron star PSR J0740+6620 to date was detected. Since 2004, 28 new complex molecules have been discovered in the interstellar medium with the Green Bank Telescope.

== Funding threatened ==
In response to limited budgetary issues, the Division of Astronomical Sciences (AST) of the National Science Foundation (NSF) commissioned a portfolio review committee, which conducted its work between September 2011 and August 2012. The committee, which reviewed all AST-supported facilities and activities, was composed of 17 external scientists and chaired by Daniel Eisenstein of Harvard University. As part of the committee's August 2012 recommendation for the closure of six facilities, was that the Robert C. Byrd Green Bank Telescope (GBT) should be defunded over a five-year period.

In July 2014, the United States Senate Committee on Appropriations approved the NSF's fiscal year 2014 budget, which did not call for divestment of the GBT in that fiscal year. The facility then began looking for partners to help fund its $10 million annual operating costs.

On October 1, 2016, the National Radio Astronomy Observatory at Green Bank separated from the NSF and began accepting funding from private sources to stay operational as an independent institution, the Green Bank Observatory.

== Relation to Breakthrough Listen ==
The telescope is a key facility of the Breakthrough Listen project, in which it is used to scan for radio signals possibly emitted by extraterrestrial technologies. In late 2017, the telescope was used to scan the interstellar object ʻOumuamua for signs of extraterrestrial intelligence as it passed through the Solar System.

== See also ==
- Grote Reber
- List of astronomical observatories
- List of radio telescopes
- Project Ozma
