= Very Long Baseline Array =

System of ten radio telescopes

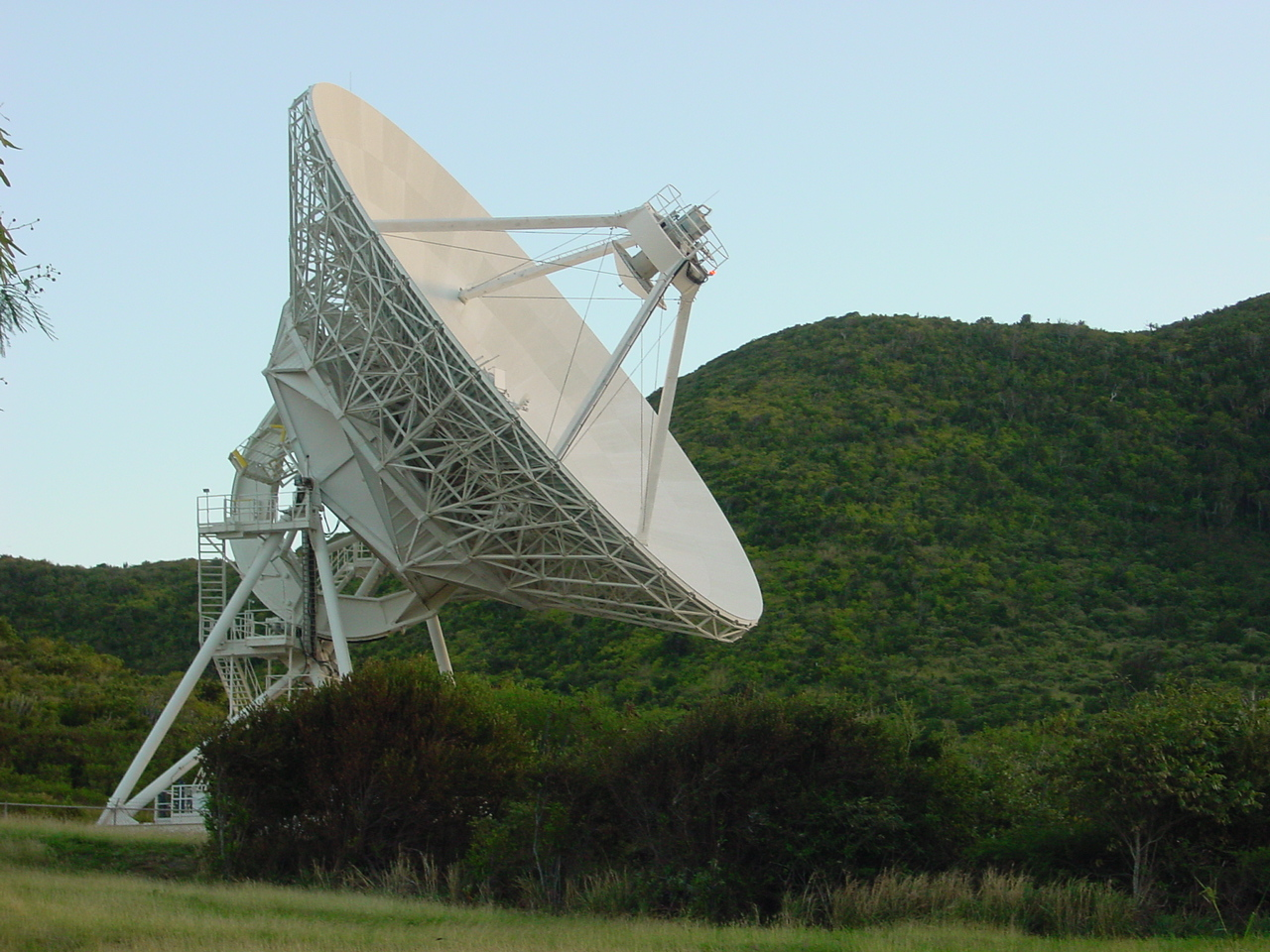
- The eastern terminus of the VLBA, on Saint Croix, U.S. Virgin Islands
- Alternative names: VLBA
- Organization: Long Baseline Observatory
- Location: Washington, Pacific Northwest, Western North America, North America, Northern Hemisphere
- Coordinates: 34°04′44″N 107°37′06″W
- Website: public.nrao.edu/telescopes/vlba/
- Telescopes: Brewster VLBA station; Fort Davis VLBA station; Hancock VLBA station; Kitt Peak VLBA station; Los Alamos VLBA station; Mauna Kea VLBA station; North Liberty VLBA station; OVRO VLBA station; Pie Town VLBA station; St. Croix VLBA station
- Location of Very Long Baseline Array
- Related media on Commons

The Very Long Baseline Array (VLBA) is a system of ten radio telescopes which are operated remotely from their Array Operations Center located in Socorro, New Mexico, as a part of the National Radio Astronomy Observatory (NRAO). These ten radio antennas work together as an array that forms the longest system in the world that uses very long baseline interferometry. The longest baseline available in this interferometer is about 8,611 kilometers (5,351 mi).

The construction of the VLBA began in February 1986 and it was completed in May 1993. The first astrometrical observation using all ten antennas was carried out on May 29, 1993. The total cost of building the VLBA was about $85 million. The array is funded by the National Science Foundation, and costs about $10 million a year to operate.

Each receiver in the VLBA consists of a parabolic dish antenna 25 meters (82 feet) in diameter, along with its adjacent control building. This contains the supporting electronics and machinery for the receiver, including low-noise electronics, digital computers, data storage units, and the antenna-pointing machinery. Each of the antennas is about as tall as a ten-story building when the antenna is pointed straight up, and each antenna weighs about 218 metric tons (240 short tons).

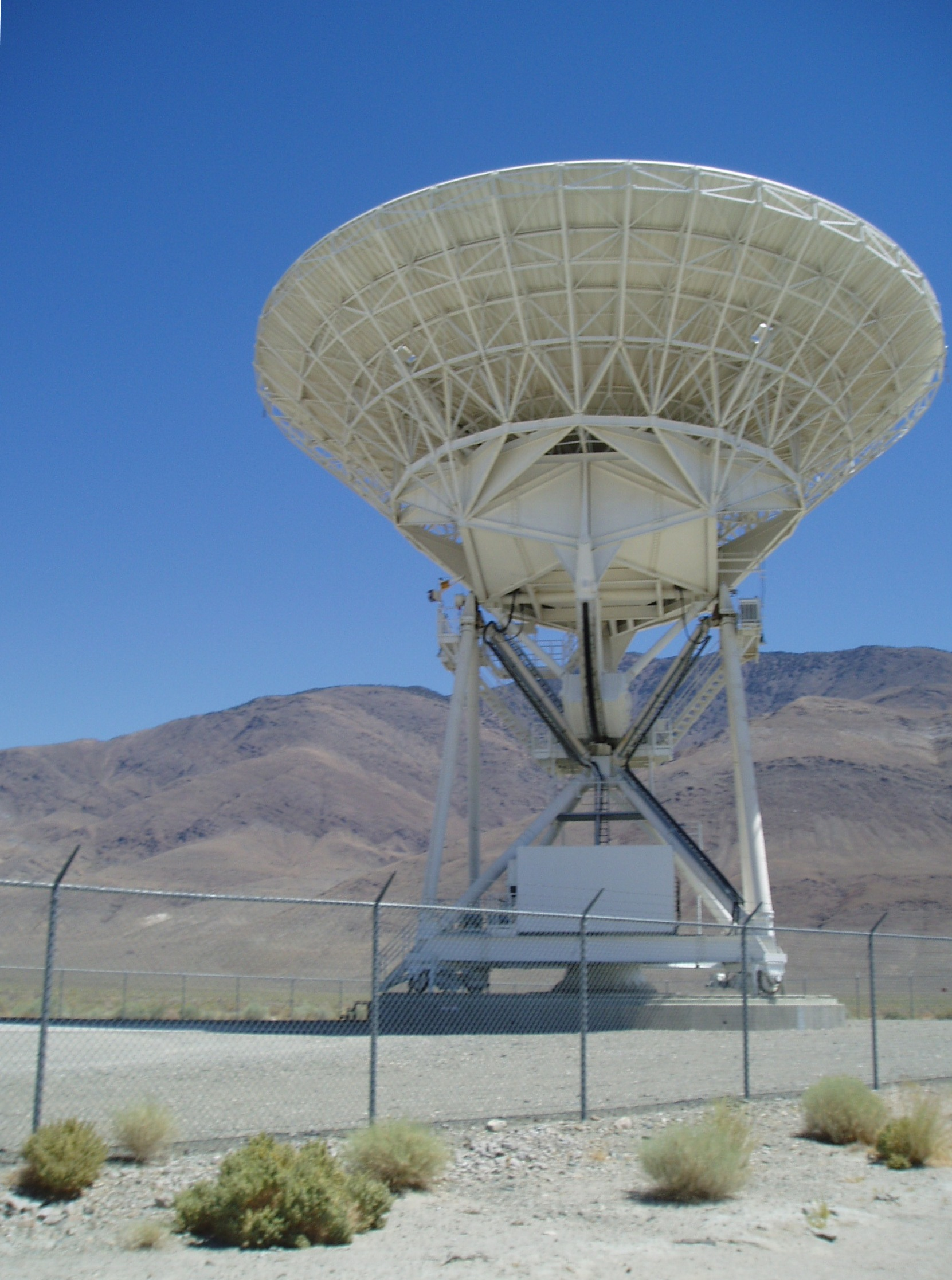
The VLBA telescope in Owens Valley, California

The signals from each antenna are recorded on a bank of approximately one-terabyte hard disc drives, and the information is time-stamped using atomic clocks. Once the disc drives are loaded with information, they are carried to the Pete V. Domenici Science Operations Center at the NRAO in Socorro. There, the information undergoes signal processing in a powerful set of digital computers that carry out the interferometry. These computers also make corrections for the rotation of the Earth, the slight shifts in the crust of the Earth over time, and other small measurement errors.

== Observations by the VLBA ==
The Very Long Baseline Array usually makes radio observations at wavelengths from three millimeters to 90 centimeters, or in other words, at frequencies from 0.3 gigahertz to 96 gigahertz. Within this frequency range, the VLBA observes in eight different frequency bands that are useful for radio astronomy. The VLBA also makes observations in two narrow radio bands below one gigahertz that include spectral lines produced by bright maser emissions.

The VLBA radio telescopes are located at:

VLBA locations (red) and HSA locations (blue) in the contiguous United States
VLBA locations (red) and HSA locations (blue) around the world

VLBA Locations
Toponym	U.S. state	Geographic coordinate system	
St. Croix	U.S. Virgin Islands	17.75652°N 64.58376°W	SC
Hancock	New Hampshire	42.93362°N 71.98681°W	HN
North Liberty	Iowa	41.77165°N 91.574133°W	NL
Fort Davis	Texas	30.635214°N 103.944826°W	FD
Los Alamos	New Mexico	35.7752887°N 106.2455897°W	LA
Pie Town	New Mexico	34.30107°N 108.11912°W	PT
Kitt Peak	Arizona	31.956253°N 111.612361°W	KP
Owens Valley	California	37.23176°N 118.27714°W	OV
Brewster	Washington	48.13117°N 119.68325°W	BR
Mauna Kea	Hawaii	19.80159°N 155.45581°W	MK

== High-Sensitivity Array ==
The use of the VLBA can be scheduled dynamically, and its sensitivity can be improved by a factor of five by including other radio telescopes such as the Green Bank Telescope in West Virginia, the Very Large Array (VLA) in New Mexico and the Effelsberg radio telescope in Germany. These three additional sites are brought online for as much as 100 hours per four-month trimester. In this configuration, the entire array is known as the High-Sensitivity Array (HSA). The Arecibo radio telescope in Puerto Rico was also used, before it collapsed.

High-Sensitive Array locations
Toponym	State	Geographic coordinate system	
Green Bank	West Virginia	38°25′59″N 79°50′23″W	GB
Very Large Array	New Mexico	34°04′44″N 107°37′06″W	Y27
Effelsberg	Germany	50°31′30″N 6°53′00″E	EB

== Baseline distance and angular resolution ==
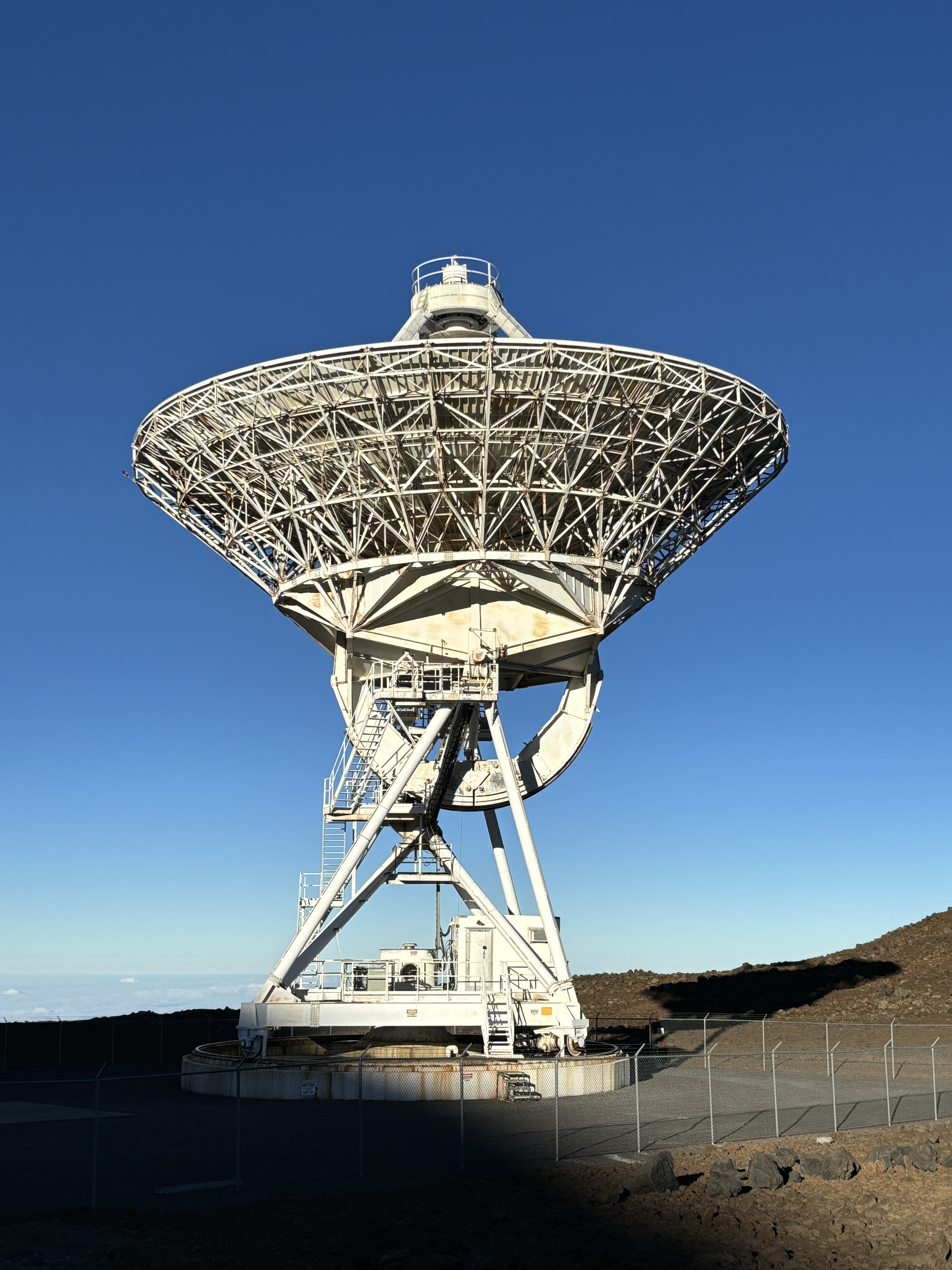
Radio telescope at Mauna Kea

Distance between each VLBA baseline (km):

Distances between locations
—	SC	HN	NL	FD	LA	PT	KP	OV	BR	MK	EB	AR	GB	Y27
SC	—	2853	3645	4143	4458	4579	4839	5460	5767	8611	6822	238	2708	4532
HN	2853	—	1611	3105	3006	3226	3623	3885	3657	7502	5602	2748	829	3198
NL	3645	1611	—	1654	1432	1663	2075	2328	2300	6156	6734	3461	1064	1640
FD	4143	3105	1654	—	608	564	744	1508	2345	5134	8084	3922	2354	515
LA	4458	3006	1432	608	—	236	652	1088	1757	4970	7831	4246	2344	226
PT	4579	3226	1663	564	236	—	417	973	1806	4795	8014	4365	2551	52
KP	4839	3623	2075	744	652	417	—	845	1913	4466	8321	4623	2939	441
OV	5460	3885	2328	1508	1088	973	845	—	1214	4015	8203	5255	3323	1025
BR	5767	3657	2300	2345	1757	1806	1913	1214	—	4398	7441	5585	3326	1849
MK	8611	7502	6156	5134	4970	4795	4466	4015	4398	—	10328	8434	7028	4835
EB	6822	5602	6734	8084	7831	8014	8321	8203	7441	10328	—	6911	6335	8008
AR	238	2748	3461	3922	4246	4365	4623	5255	5585	8434	6911	—	2545	4317
GB	2708	829	1064	2354	2344	2551	2939	3323	3326	7028	6335	2545	—	2516
Y27	4532	3198	1640	515	226	52	441	1025	1849	4835	8008	4317	2516	—

The longest baseline in the array is 8,611 kilometres (5,351 mi).

Minimum angular resolution
Wavelength (cm)	90	50	21	18	13	6	4	2	1	0.7
$\theta_{HPBW}$ (milliarcseconds)	22	12	5.0	4.3	3.2	1.4	0.85	0.47	0.32	0.17

== See also ==
- List of radio telescopes
