= 4C +29.30 =

Galaxy in the constellation Cancer

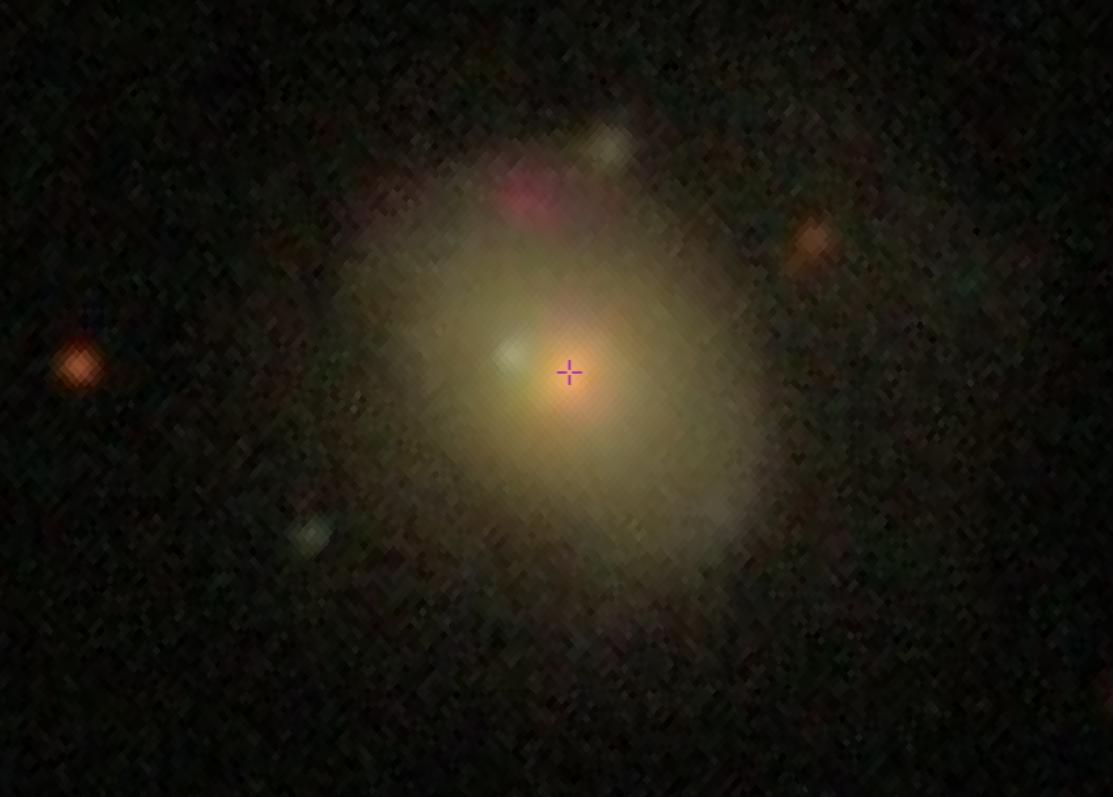
- 4C +29.30 captured by SDSS

Observation data (J2000 epoch)
- Constellation: Cancer
- Right ascension: 08h 40m 02.366s
- Declination: +29d 49m 02.64s
- Redshift: 0.064840
- Heliocentric radial velocity: 19,439 kilometer per second
- Distance: 850 Mly (260.6 Mpc)
- Apparent magnitude (V): 0.15
- Apparent magnitude (B): 0.20
- Surface brightness: 15.6

Characteristics
- Type: Sc, diffuse, WAT, Sy 2
- Size: 0.62' x 0.53'
- Notable features: Radio galaxy, seyfert galaxy

Other designations
- IRAS 08369+2959, B2 0836+29B, CGCG 150-014, PGC 24369, KISSB 004, FIRST J084002.2+294900, IVS B0836+299, TXS 0836+299, 87GB 083657.9+295941, 2CXO J084002.3+294902

4C +29.30 is an elliptical galaxy located in the constellation Cancer. Its redshift is 0.064840 which corresponds to a light travel time of 850 million light-years from Earth. It is a wide-angled tailed radio galaxy (WAT) and a Seyfert galaxy.

== An active galaxy ==
The nucleus of 4C +29.30 is found to be active. It is specially classified as a Fanaroff-Riley Class I (FR-I) radio galaxy producing an optical radio jet, although it shows characteristics of a Fanaroff-Riley Class II. 4C +29.30 shows existence of weak extended emission, which has an angular size of ~520 arcsec (639 kpc) embedded within the galaxy with a compact edge-brightened double-lobed source of 29 arcsecs (36 kpc). 4C +29.30 has been catalogued as an infrared point source by IRAS, WISE and the Two Micron All Sky Survey (2MASS).

The galaxy shows a complex X-ray morphology which shows the main features of a nucleus, a jet, hotspots and lobes which was detected during the snapshot 8 ks Chandra Observation by Gambil et al. (2003). Its nucleus is found to have absorbed (N H ≈ 3.95+0.27 -0.33 × 1023 cm-2) and an unabsorbed luminosity of L 2-10 keV ≈ (5.08 ± 0.52) × 1043 erg s-1, showing a characteristic of a Seyfert Type 2. Furthermore, it shows an early-type morphology, which has a moderate radio luminosity of ~10 ergs 1, presenting signatures of jet reactivation.

4C +29.30 is particularly a subject of interest since there has been multiple episodes of activity revealed from morphology and by spectral properties of radio emission over broad range of scales. It was first studied by van Breugel et al. (1986) who found optical line emitting gas to ~20 arcsec north of nucleus, and adjacent to the radio jet along a position angle PA = 24°. There is evidence of the radio jet interacting with dense extranuclear gas, suggesting the recent activity in 4C +29.30 after merging with a gas-rich disk galaxy.

A 4.3 kpc x 6.2 kpc extended emission in ionized gas can be found in 4C +29.30, displaying structures that resembles rotated disks, spiral arms and bars resembling a spiral galaxy of type Sc. The galaxy also displays a dust lane passing through its central region similar to Centaurus A. According to Jamrozy et al. (2007), a low-surface brightness, radio emission extending to ~600 kpc has been detected and studied, which its structure is characterized by a steep radio spectrum. The age of the small-scale radio structure embedded within the extended radio emission, is estimated to be ≲ 100 Myr, with the inner double knots of a spectral age of ≲ 33 Myr being resolved to two separate nuclear knots of spectral ages of ~15 yr and ~70 yr.

== Observation of 4C +29.30 ==
Between January 12 and March 15, 2016, 4C +29.30 was observed by the Integral Field Unit (IFU) of the Gemini Multi-object Spectrograph, mounted on a Gemini North Telescope. A 'One-slit' model is used, with a rectangular view of ≈ 3.5 arcsec × 5.0 arcsec which corresponds to 4.3 x 6.2 kpc^{2} at the galaxy. At least 15 exposures of 1140s were obtained, slightly shifted and dithered up to 0.8 arcsec for both axes, to correct detector effects after the combination of frames.

For the spectral with wavelength coverage in range of ʎ4500-7300 and centered at ʎ5900, this were obtained through the use of B600+_G5307 grating and IFU-R mask. The spectral resolution is found to be R~3600 at ~ʎ3700 (~83 km^{1}), derived from the full width half-maximum (FWHM) of the CuAr emission lines. The spectral dithering was also performed with a maximum separation of 102.5 Å between exposures. These data reduction were performed through using IRAF packages provided by the Gemini Observatory, with the procedure consisting of sky and bias subtraction, flat-fielding, trimming, wavelength and relative flux calibration, building of the datacubes, final alignment and average combination with an average sigma clipping into the final datacube, which has a spatial binning of 0.1 x 0.1 arcsec 2.

== Estimating ionized gas properties of 4C +29.30 ==
Thanks to the data provided, researchers were able to calculate the total mass of ionized hydrogen gas in 4C +29.30, which the total mass of emitted ionized hydrogen gas is M ≈ 2.3 x 10 (5), where L_{41}(H α) is the H α luminosity in units of erg s−1 and n_{3} is the electron density in units of 10^{3}/ cm^{3}. The H α luminosity is calculated via correcting the emitted flux for reddening assuming the Cardelli et al. (1989) reddening law where R_{V} = 3.1. The total amount of the mass outflow rate of 4C +29.30 is obtained with the ~3 kpc radius.

For the mass outflow rate and outflow kinetic power in the southern knot (SK) with a high blueshift of (≈ -600 km/s -1) and the redshifted northern knot (NK) at ~1"4 from the nucleus, researchers estimated them via adopting a biconical geometry for the outflowing gas. This can be calculated as Mout = 1.4ne mp vout A F, where mp = 1.7 x 10 (-24)g is proton mass, ne is electron density, vout is the outflow velocity which is the cone cross-section (base), f is the filling factor and the factor of 1.4 refers to elements that is heavier compared to hydrogen. Through the assumption of geometry, they were able to obtain a cross-area of the outflow of A = 4.6 x 10 (43) for both regions. The total mass outflow rates are then calculated for each separate knot, using the likely inclination of 40°. This gives a total mass outflow rate calculation of Mout = 25.4 (+11.5 divided by -7.5) M_{☉}/yr and an outflow kinetic of E = 8.1 (+10.7 divided by -4.0) erg/s. Compared to ionized gas outflows mass rates in seyfert galaxies in the range 0.1–10 M_{☉}/yr, the outflows in 4C +29.30 have higher mass of ionized gas.

Through sampling all the data collected by the researchers, this proves that the ionized gas mass outflow rate and the outflow kinetic power in 4C +29.30 is higher than other estimations in radio galaxies like 3C 293 and PKS 1345+12, but with its kinetic power compatible to those obtained for ESO 428-G14.

== Black hole ==
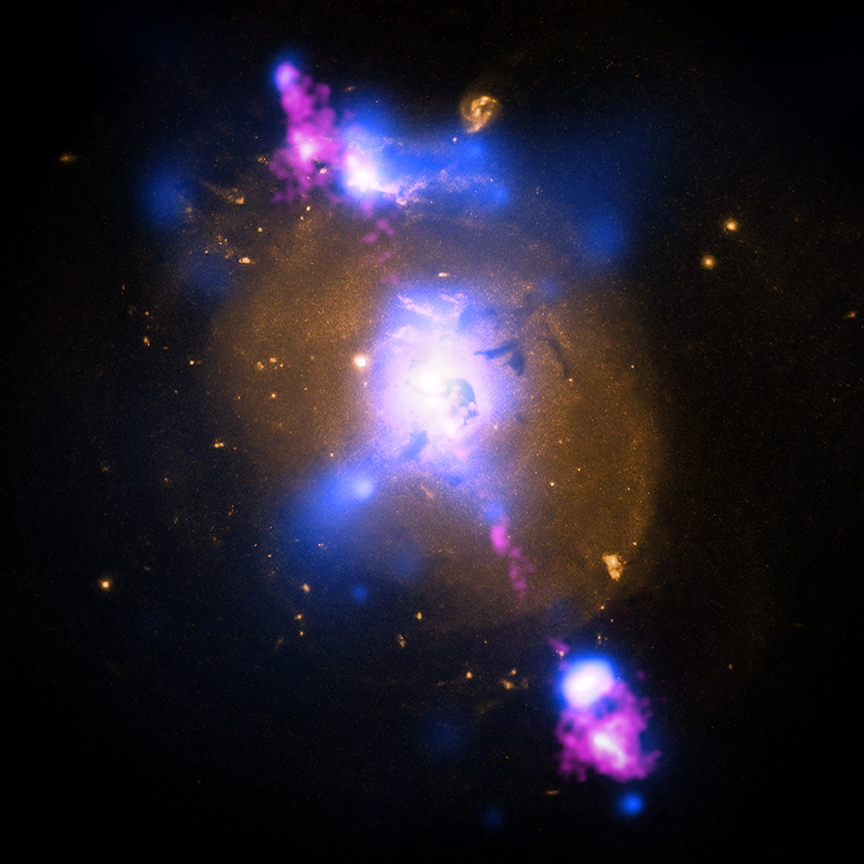
Chandra X-ray Observatory image of the black hole in 4C +29.30

The supermassive black hole in 4C +29.30 has an estimated mass of 100 million times the Sun. A further study shows there are two jets of particles, speeding millions of miles per hour away from the black hole, each of them showing larger areas of radio emission located outside the galaxy. A pool of hot gas is around the black hole, in which some of the material will be consumed and the magnetized whirlpool triggers more output in return to the radio jet. It is suggested by heating up the gas in clumps and dragging cool gas along, the jets deprive the black hole of its fuel supply, thus making it hungry.

4C +29.30 also contains a dusty torus, containing dust and gas, which blocks optical light produced near the black hole. This suggests 4C +29.30 belongs to hidden/buried AGNs, a new class emerging among the Swift/BAT hard X-ray-selected AGNs.
