= 40-foot radio telescope =

Radio telescope in Green Bank, West Virginia, US

40-foot telescope
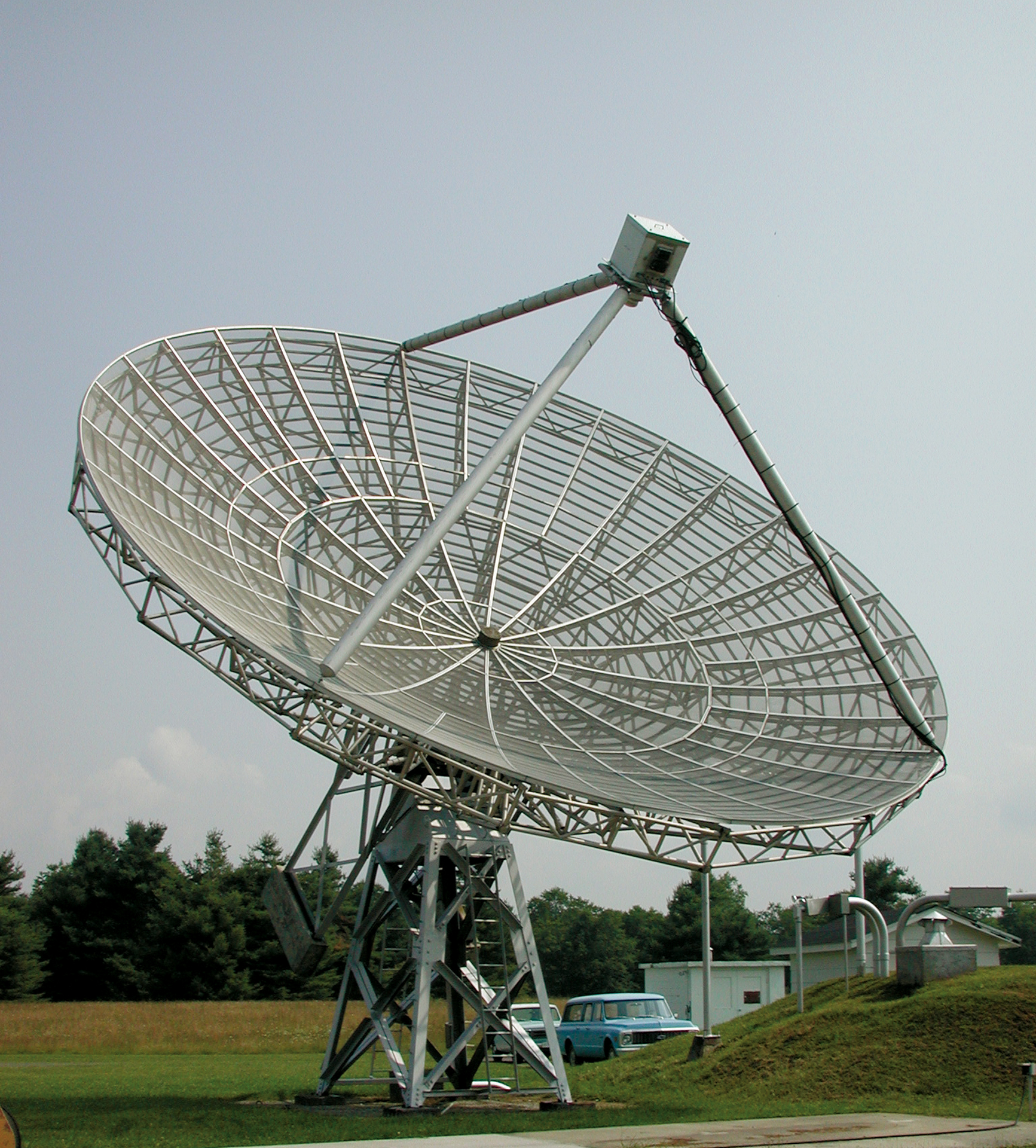
- Location: Green Bank, Pocahontas County, West Virginia
- Coordinates: 38°26′14″N 79°49′53″W
- Altitude: 2,684 feet (818 m)
- First light: 14 December 1961
- Diameter: 40 ft (12 m)
- Location within the United States
- Related media on Commons

The 40-foot radio telescope at Green Bank Observatory in the U.S. state of West Virginia was constructed in 1961, and started observing a selection of variable radio sources in the same year, completing its observations in 1968. It became the first automated telescope in 1962. It was subsequently used during summer schools, and in 1987 it was repurposed as an educational telescope, as well as continuing to observe radio sources. In 2021 the telescope celebrated its sixtieth anniversary, having been in continuous use since its 1987 restoration, and used by more than 1,500 students.

== Specifications ==
The radio telescope has a diameter of 40 feet (12 m) in the form of a parabolic reflector. The surface is made of steel mesh, with a superstructure of galvanised steel. It is a transit telescope: it only moves in elevation, not in azimuth (horizontally), and relies on the Earth's rotation to observe the full sky.

It observes at L band, originally at 1340–1580 MHz, more recently at 1355–1485 MHz, both in radio continuum mode. It can also observe neutral hydrogen emission at 1420.41 MHz in spectroscopy. Since 1994 it records the telescope output both digitally and on chart recorders.

== History ==
The 40-foot was ordered in 1961 from Antenna Systems. It was delivered to Green Bank Observatory in December 1961, and took two days to assemble. Its first light was on 14 December 1961. The original control system was constructed by the National Radio Astronomy Observatory (NRAO). On 1 February 1962, it became the first telescope to be fully automated, ahead of the automation of optical telescopes like that at Washburn Observatory from the late 1960s onwards. It was used to survey a number of variable radio sources from 1962 until 1968.

After the completion of the survey in 1968, it was used occasionally as an educational instrument as part of the Green Bank radio astronomy summer schools. In 1987 it was restored and upgraded for full use as an educational telescope, including by local science teachers as part of the Secondary Science Teachers Institute (SSTI). The restoration reused the 1960 dipole antenna and radome from the Tatel Telescope, which was used during the Project Ozma. A substantial part of the spectrometer was reused from the 300 Foot Telescope. In 1991 this changed to the 'Learning to Investigate the Universe' (LITU) project, changing again in 1994 to Research Experiences in Teacher Preparation (RETP). It has also been used by the annual Educational Research in Radio Astronomy (ERIRA) program since 1992, and Green Bank Observatory's "Radio Astronomer for a Day" program for K–12 students.

The 40-foot telescope has been in continuous use since its restoration and has been used by over 1,500 students. It celebrated its 60th anniversary in 2021.

== Science ==
It was originally used to observe eight variable radio sources on a daily basis over the course of five years. The sources were 3C 48, 3C 144 (Taurus A), 3C 218 (Hydra A), 3C 274 (Virgo A), 3C 295, 3C 358, 3C 405 (Cygnus A), and 3C 461 (Cassiopeia A). The project was led by D. S. Heeschen, who had previously been using the 85 feet (26 m) antenna for this work. The use of a relatively cheap telescope for this work freed up larger telescopes for other uses. In initial results, the sources were observed on a daily basis at 20 and 40 cm over 28 months, and only Cas A was seen to be variable.

As part of its educational use, it has continued to observe some of the original radio sources it was targeting. Data from 1995 to 1999 comparing Cas A to Cyg A was published in 2000, followed in 2017 by a publication combining 20 years of observations of Cas A using new observations between 1994 and 2015. These tracked the fading of the source and improved the flux density calibration models that use this source.

It has also been used to observe the H I region in the spiral arms of the Milky Way and the Andromeda Galaxy, as well as intensity and polarized synchrotron radiation from the galactic plane and the North Polar Spur.
