= The End of Quiet =

2025 documentary film

- Den sidste stilhed
- Directed by: Kasper Bisgaard; Mikael Lypinski
- Written by: Kasper Bisgaard; Mikael Lypinski
- Produced by: Sara Stockmann
- Cinematography: Mikael Lypinski
- Edited by: Charlotte Munch Bengtsen; Johan Löfstedt
- Music by: Uno Helmersson
- Production companies: Sonntag Pictures; Picky Pictures
- Release date: 7 June 2025 (premiere); (Tribeca Festival)
- Running time: 83 minutes
- Countries: Denmark; Sweden
- Language: English

The End of Quiet (Danish: Den sidste stilhed) is a 2025 documentary film directed by Kasper Bisgaard and Mikael Lypinski. Set in Green Bank, West Virginia, the film follows the lives of residents in the Quiet Zone, where the use of mobile phones and other electronic devices is largely restricted.

It had its world premiere in the Documentary Competition at the 2025 Tribeca Festival on 7 June 2025.

== Plot summary ==
Set in Green Bank, West Virginia, the film follows several residents of the town, which is located within the United States National Radio Quiet Zone. The area is home to the Green Bank Telescope and has restrictions on cellular services and Wi-Fi to limit radio interference. The film explores the lives of residents and their relationship with the restrictions as connectivity becomes increasingly difficult to avoid.

== Production ==
According to co-director Kasper Bisgaard, the idea for The End of Quiet originated after he discovered a photograph of the giant dish at Green Bank Observatory. He became interested in people living there and pitched the idea to Mikael Lypinski, who proposed they both collaborate on the film.

The project was initially conceived as a short documentary, but after Bisgaard and Lypinski travelled to Green Bank, West Virginia in May 2019, where they spent a month meeting residents, they realised it had to be a feature-length film.

Production was interrupted by the COVID-19 pandemic, which prevented the film crew from returning until 2022. According to Bisgaard, the planned return was for reshoots and small number of additional scenes, but changes in the participants' lives during the three-year absence expanded the scope of the documentary.

Lypinski said that the filmmakers found it easier to build relationships with Green Bank residents because of the town's slower pace of life, which encouraged face-to-face interactions and allowed them to have more intimate conversations with their subjects.

The filmmakers spent approximately two months filming in Green Bank across their 2019 and 2022 visits. The film was produced by Sara Stockmann for Sonntag Pictures.

== Release ==
The End of Quiet had its world premiere in the Documentary Competition at the 2025 Tribeca Festival on 7 June 2025. It was subsequently selected for the Environmental Film Programme at the 2025 Tallinn Black Nights Film Festival (PÖFF), where it screened on 13 November 2025.

In 2026, the film screened at the Göteborg Film Festival in the Nordic Competition section, the One World Film Festival in Prague as part of its Vision of Today programme, and the DOK.fest München in the Visions of the Future section.

== Reception ==
=== Critical reviews ===
Sara Clements, writing for Next Best Picture, praised the film's cinematography and soundscape, describing it as "gorgeously shot", but found that some conversations became dull and that certain sequences lacked narrative momentum. She nevertheless concluded that the film "ultimately succeeds in making the invisible visible and the inaudible profound."

Nicki Bruun of Ekko praised the film's imagery and portrayal of Green Bank, but criticized its lack of a unifying perspective and the limited development of its subjects.

Benjamin Damon of Soundvenue praised the film's cinematography, Uno Helmersson's score and its portrayal of the Green Bank community.

Reviewing the film for Politiken, Lucia Odoom gave the film four out of six hearts. She wrote that The End of Quiet portrays the residents of Green Bank with warmth and empathy while using the community to reflect on humanity's relationship with technology. Odoom praised the film's imagery and pacing, arguing that its themes of silence, connection, and what people seek in life make it "a film you think about for days after seeing it."

=== Accolades ===
Festival/Organisation	Year	Award/Category	Recipient(s)	Result	Ref.
Tribeca Festival	2025	Best Documentary Feature	Kasper Bisgaard and Mikael Lypinski	Nominated	
Tribeca Festival	2025	Best Cinematography – Documentary Feature	Mikael Lypinski	Nominated	
Tribeca Festival	2025	Best Editing in a Documentary Feature	Charlotte Munch Bengtsen and Johan Löfstedt	Nominated	
Tribeca Festival	2025	Audience Award – Documentary	Kasper Bisgaard and Mikael Lypinski	Nominated	
Gothenburg Film Festival	2026	Dragon Award for Best Nordic Documentary	Kasper Bisgaard and Mikael Lypinski	Nominated	
Gothenburg Film Festival	2026	Audience Award for Best Nordic Film	Kasper Bisgaard and Mikael Lypinski	Nominated	
One World Film Festival	2026	One World Audience Award	Kasper Bisgaard and Mikael Lypinski	Nominated	
DOK.fest München	2026	Audience Award	Kasper Bisgaard and Mikael Lypinski	Nominated	
DOK.fest München	2026	DOK.edit Award	Charlotte Munch Bengtsen and Johan Löfstedt	Nominated	
DOK.fest München	2026	VIKTOR DOK.international Award – Best Film	Kasper Bisgaard and Mikael Lypinski	Nominated	
TV-Prisen	2026	Best Documentary	Sara Stockmann, Kasper Bisgaard and Mikael Lypinski	Nominated	
