= Tatel =

Tatel may refer to:

- David S. Tatel (born 1942), American judge
- The Tatel Telescope, part of the former Green Bank Interferometer in Green Bank, West Virginia, U.S.
