= United States National Radio Quiet Zone =

Area in which radio transmissions are heavily restricted

Coordinates: 38.375°N 79.5°W

The NRQZ includes portions of West Virginia and Virginia and a small part of Maryland.

The National Radio Quiet Zone (NRQZ) is a large area of land in the United States designated as a radio quiet zone, in which radio transmissions are restricted by law to facilitate scientific research and the gathering of military intelligence. About half of the zone is located in the Blue Ridge Mountains of west-central Virginia while the other half is in the Allegheny Mountains of east-central West Virginia; a small part of the zone is in the southernmost tip of the Maryland panhandle.

== Location ==
The Quiet Zone is an approximate rectangle of land, 107.0 miles (172.2 km) on the north edge, 109.6 miles (176.4 km) on the south edge and 120.9 miles (194.6 km) on the east and west edges, comprising approximately 13,000 square miles (34,000 km^{2}; 8,300,000 acres). It straddles the borders of Virginia and West Virginia, and also includes a small part of Maryland. The NRQZ is centered between the Green Bank Observatory in Green Bank, West Virginia, and Sugar Grove Station in Sugar Grove, West Virginia. It includes all land with latitudes between 37° 30' 0.4" N and 39° 15' 0.4" N, and longitudes between 78° 29' 59.0" W and 80° 29' 59.2" W. The center of the NRQZ is located in Monterey, Virginia.

== Restrictions ==
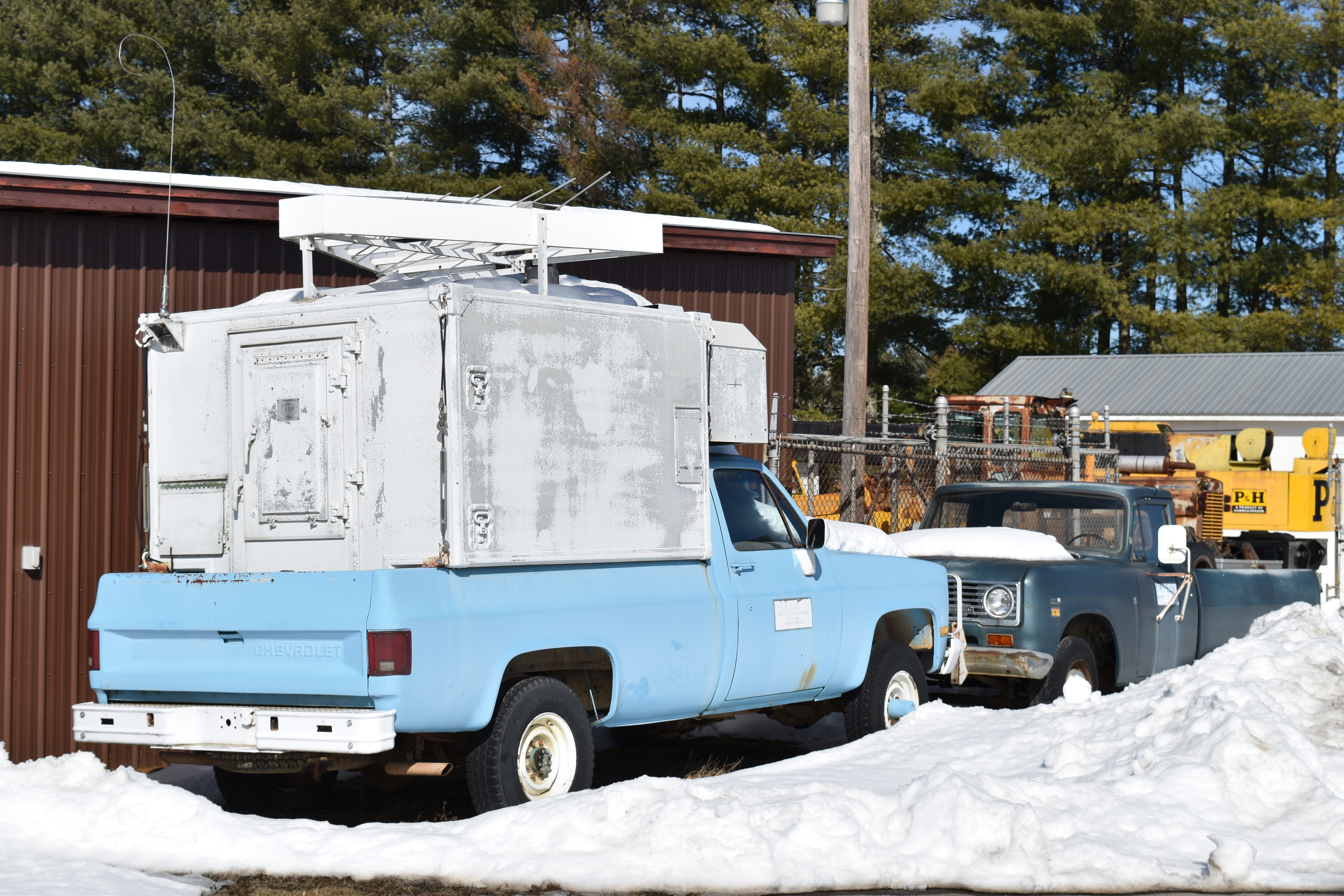
An older patrol truck used to locate radio interference

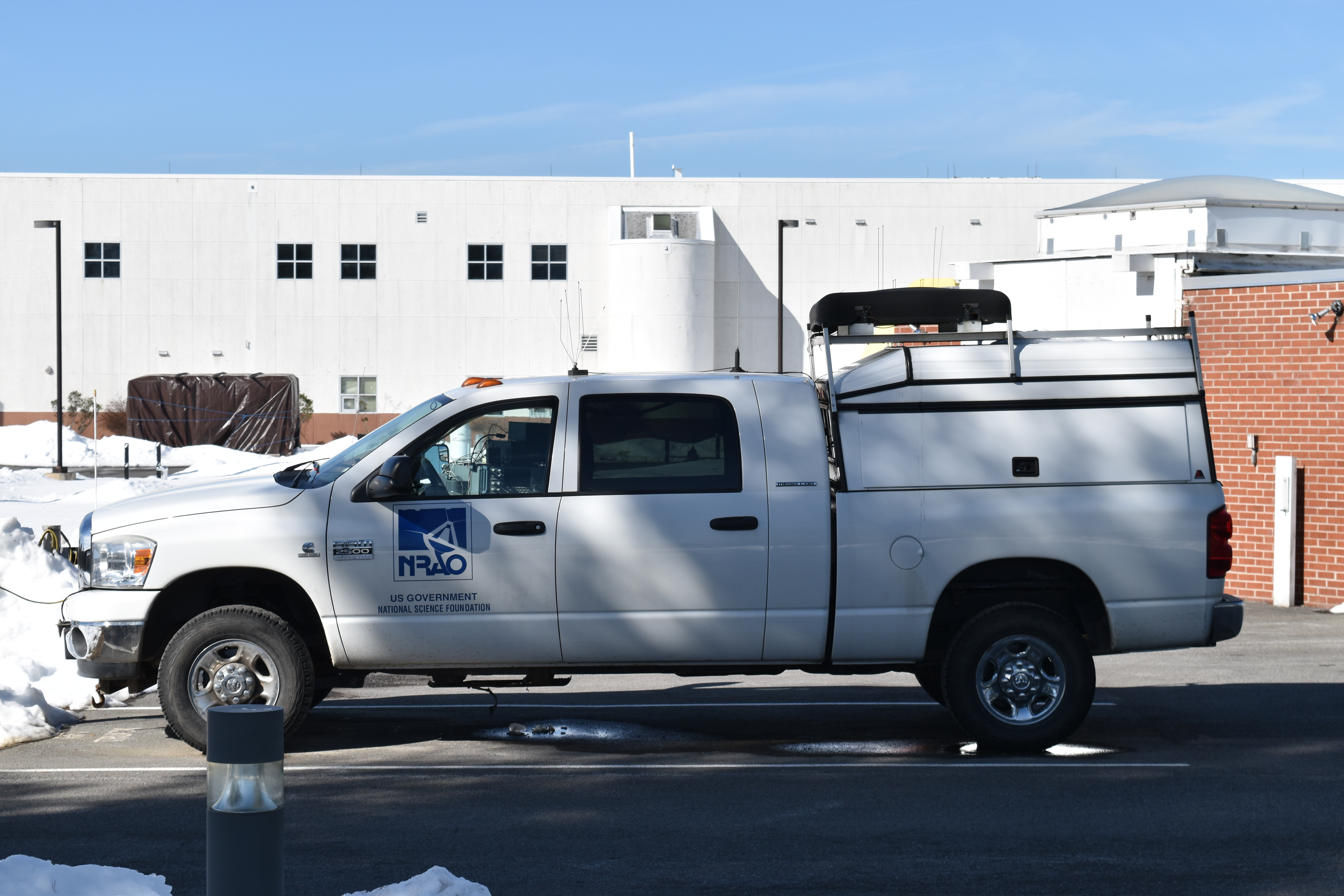
A modern patrol truck equipped with detectors

Most broadcast transmitters in the central area of the Quiet Zone are required to operate at reduced power and use directional antennas. This makes cable and satellite essential for acceptable television in much of the region. Restrictions of transmissions are strictest within ten miles (16 km) of the Green Bank and Sugar Grove facilities, where most omnidirectional and high-power transmissions are prohibited.

Not all radio transmissions are prohibited in the Quiet Zone. For example, emergency service (police, fire, and ambulance) radios and CB radios are permitted. However, owners of high-power transmitters, including television stations in the Harrisonburg–Staunton and Charlottesville markets, must coordinate their operations with the Green Bank Observatory. The only broadcast radio stations in the core of the Quiet Zone are part of the Allegheny Mountain Radio network, with one daytimer AM station in Frost, West Virginia, ten miles from the observatory, and low-powered FM stations in Monterey, Virginia and Marlinton, West Virginia. Exceptions to restrictions are usually determined case by case, with preference given to public safety concerns, such as for remote alarm systems, repeaters for emergency services, and NOAA Weather Radio.

The most severe restrictions to the general public are imposed within a 20-mile (32 km) radius of the Green Bank Observatory. The Observatory polices the area actively for devices emitting excessive electromagnetic radiation such as microwave ovens, Wi-Fi access points, and faulty electrical equipment and asks people to stop using such equipment. It does not have enforcement power (although the FCC can impose a fine of $50 on violators) but will work with residents to find solutions.

Cellular telephone use in the central area of the zone is also very restricted.

"In Green Bank, though, the rules are even stronger, so much that some residents who are in direct sight of the radio telescope receivers, can't use Wi-Fi devices and even microwave ovens in all Green Bank Radio Astronomy housing units. Directional cellphone service areas are very limited, such as in Snowshoe Mountain Resort in nearby Snowshoe, West Virginia, one of the state's major ski areas."

However, the observatory has pulled back on Quiet Zone enforcement, and locals have increasingly embraced the usage of microwave ovens, cellphones, and WiFi.

The Green Bank resident and high school teacher had a microwave. She had a smartphone. She had Wi-Fi. She knew where to get a cell phone signal. "It's not like we're living some bohemian lifestyle," she told me. Such was hardly a secret. A house across the street from the observatory had Wi-Fi with the network name "Screw you NRAO," an unsubtle middle finger to the observatory's calls for quiet. Green Bank’s health clinic had Wi-Fi. So did the senior center. "We're not supposed to," said John Simmons, the county's director of senior programs and a former county commissioner, "But I think all that stuff about the noise levels is fabricated."

In 2019, the Green Bank Interference Protection Group was picking up about 175 hotspots within two miles of the observatory.

In October 2024, it was reported that 99.5% of the Quiet Zone had been, or would soon be, eligible for Starlink service.

=== Zones of protection ===
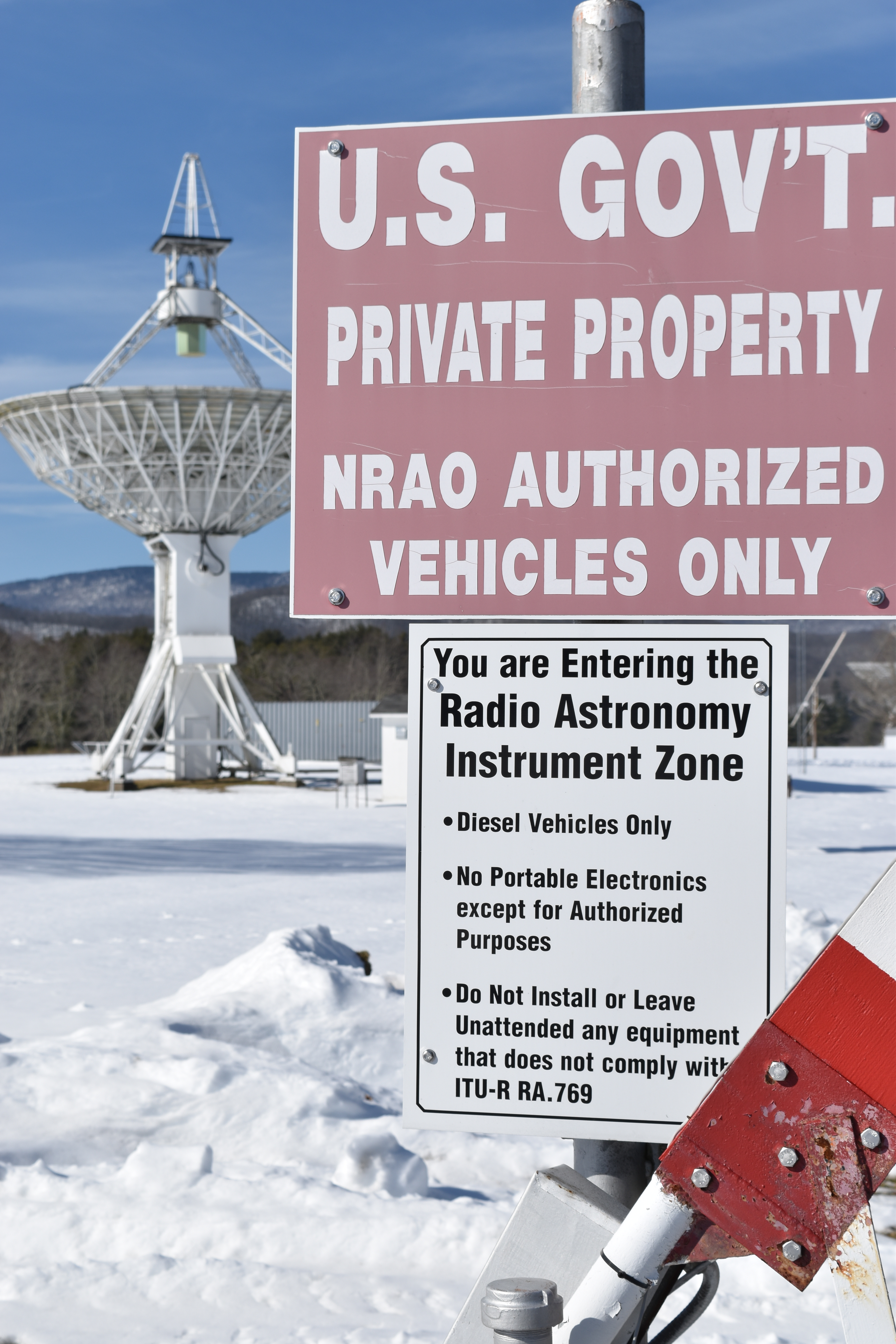
Warning signs at Zone 1 entrance

The Green Bank Interference Protection Group maintains policies to manage radio-frequency interference (RFI) by dividing into five zones based on available legal instruments. The National Radio Quiet Zone Administrator at the Green Bank Observatory manages the enforcement policies.

Zones 1 and Zone 2 are located within the property of the Green Bank Observatory. The entire property is designated Zone 1 except small portions (such as housing, visitor, and laboratory areas) that are designated Zone 2. Zone 1, the Radio Astronomy Instrument Zone, restricts intentional radiators to those that are deemed essential. All unintentional radiators must be operated within the ITU-R RA.769 recommendations on protection criteria used for radio astronomical measurements. Gasoline-powered motor vehicles are prohibited in Zone 1 as their spark-ignition engines generate significant radio interference, resulting in the requirement that all vehicles and equipment be diesel-powered. Zone 2, the Observatory Building Zone, allows intentional radiators licensed by the National Radio Quiet Zone but not other radiators such as Wi-Fi, cordless phones, and other wireless equipment. Certain types of unintentional radiators are allowed. Digital cameras are prohibited, although film photography is allowed.

Zone 3 and Zone 4 are governed by the Radio Astronomy Zoning Act, Chapter 37A of the West Virginia Code. It strictly regulates radio transmitters within ten miles (16 km) of the Green Bank Observatory. Zone 3, the area within two miles (3.2 km), has the greatest restriction; it is surrounded by Zone 4, in which progressively greater emissions are allowed at greater distances. Within these zones, interference to observations are identified and documented. The owners of the offending equipment are visited personally to request cooperation in eliminating the interference. Enforcement is used as a last resort. Enforcement in Zone 4 may be more lenient than the limit set by Chapter 37A.

Zone 5 is the outermost part of the National Radio Quiet Zone.

== Uses ==
The Federal Communications Commission (FCC) created the Quiet Zone in 1958 to protect the radio telescopes at Green Bank and Sugar Grove from harmful interference. Today, the Green Bank Observatory oversees the Quiet Zone.

The Quiet Zone also protects the antennas and receivers of the Navy Information Operations Command (NIOC) at Sugar Grove. The NIOC is the location of electronic intelligence-gathering systems and is today said to be a key station in the ECHELON system operated by the National Security Agency (NSA).

The area has also attracted people who believe they suffer from electromagnetic hypersensitivity, though scientific experiments have shown this condition is caused by the nocebo effect rather than electromagnetic waves.

== Counties inside the NRQZ ==
=== Maryland counties ===
- Extreme southern Garrett

=== Virginia counties ===
See also List of radio stations in Virginia, which includes several AM and FM stations within the zone.

- Western Albemarle
- Alleghany
- Amherst, except for the southern quarter
- Extreme northern Appomattox
- Augusta
- Bath
- Extreme northern Bedford
- Northern Botetourt
- Northwestern Buckingham
- Northern Craig
- Western Greene
- Highland
- Nelson
- Western Page
- Rockbridge
- Rockingham, except for a small area in the extreme eastern part
- Western Shenandoah

=== West Virginia counties ===
See also List of radio stations in West Virginia, which includes several AM and FM stations within the zone.

- Barbour, except for a small area in the north
- Extreme eastern Braxton
- Grant, except for an area in the north
- Eastern Greenbrier
- Southwestern Hampshire
- Hardy
- Southeastern Harrison
- Eastern Lewis
- Extreme southern Mineral
- Northeastern and east central Monroe
- Extreme eastern Nicholas
- Pendleton
- Pocahontas
- Two areas in extreme southwestern and southeastern Preston
- Randolph
- Extreme southern Taylor
- Tucker, except for an area in the extreme northern part
- Upshur
- Central and eastern Webster

== Cities inside the NRQZ ==
=== Virginia cities ===
- Buena Vista
- The western half of Charlottesville, including much of the University of Virginia grounds
- Covington
- Harrisonburg
- Lexington
- Staunton
- Waynesboro

=== West Virginia cities ===
- Buckhannon
- Elkins
- Lewisburg
- Philippi
- Weston

== Outside ==
Clarksburg, Sutton (both in West Virginia), and Lynchburg, Virginia, are just outside the Quiet Zone.

== See also ==
- Cone of Silence, a fictional device from the 1960s American television series Get Smart
- Electromagnetic interference
- Radio silence
