= WKID 96.7 FM =

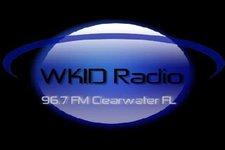

Clearwater, Florida; United States
- Broadcast area: Tampa Bay area
- Frequency: 96.7 MHz

Programming
- Format: Defunct

Ownership
- Owner: Adam "A-Dog" Baker

History
- First air date: December 25, 2004

Technical information
- Class: Low power Part 15

WKID 96.7 FM was an unlicensed low-power FM radio station in Clearwater, Florida, United States, operating under Title 47 CFR Part 15.

== History ==
WKID 96.7 FM started in 2004 as a Christmas present to Adam "A-Dog" Baker from his father, who built it using an FM transmitter kit. Nightly on-air content included stories picked out by Adam and his family and friends. At the time, they were only able to transmit to the local community.

Two years later, their setup was enlarged, and Spacial Audio became a sponsor of the station. The team grew to include about 25 children.

The station is no longer running, and the website has not been updated since 2004; it is unknown when exactly the station ceased operations.
