= Green Bank Observatory =

American astronomical observatory

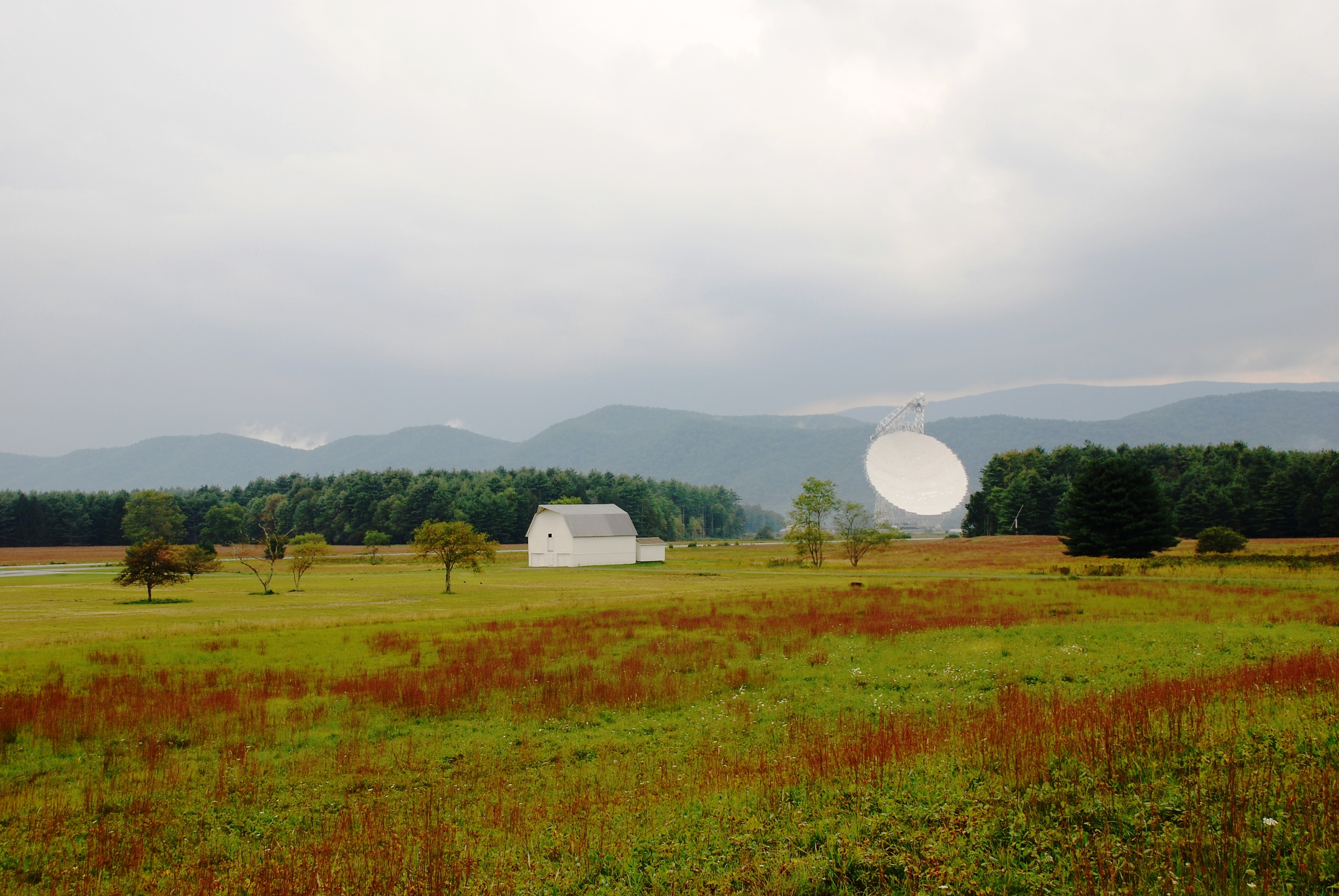
- Green Bank Telescope at NRAO Green Bank, September 2009
- Alternative names: National Radio Astronomy Observatory, Green Bank
- Named after: Green Bank
- Organization: Associated Universities, Inc.
- Observatory code: 256
- Location: Green Bank, United States National Radio Quiet Zone, Pocahontas County, United States
- Coordinates: 38°26′16″N 79°50′10″W
- Altitude: 2,684 feet (818 m)
- Observing time: 365 nights per year
- Established: November 12, 1956
- Website: greenbankobservatory.org
- Telescopes: 300 foot Radio Telescope; Ewen–Purcell Horn Antenna; Green Bank Jansky Antenna; 40-foot radio telescope; Green Bank Interferometer; Green Bank Telescope; Reber Radio Telescope
- Location of Green Bank Observatory
- Related media on Commons

The Green Bank Observatory (previously National Radio Astronomy Observatory, Green Bank) is an astronomical observatory located in the National Radio Quiet Zone in Green Bank, West Virginia, U.S. It is the operator of the Robert C. Byrd Green Bank Telescope, the world's largest fully steerable radio telescope.

The observatory was established as the National Science Foundation's (NSF) National Radio Astronomy Observatory (NRAO) in 1956 and made its first observations in 1958. It served as the NRAO's headquarters until 1966, after which the facility was known as the National Radio Astronomy Observatory, Green Bank.

In October 2016, the observatory became an independent institution following a 2012 recommendation that the NSF fully divest itself from the facility by October 1, 2016.

Green Bank Observatory subsequently retained partial NSF funding, established private contracts, and formed a partnership with West Virginia University. It is operated by the nonprofit Associated Universities, Inc., under a cooperative agreement with the National Science Foundation.The observatory was involved in the search for signal from the MAVEN spacecraft in early 2026.

== Active telescopes ==
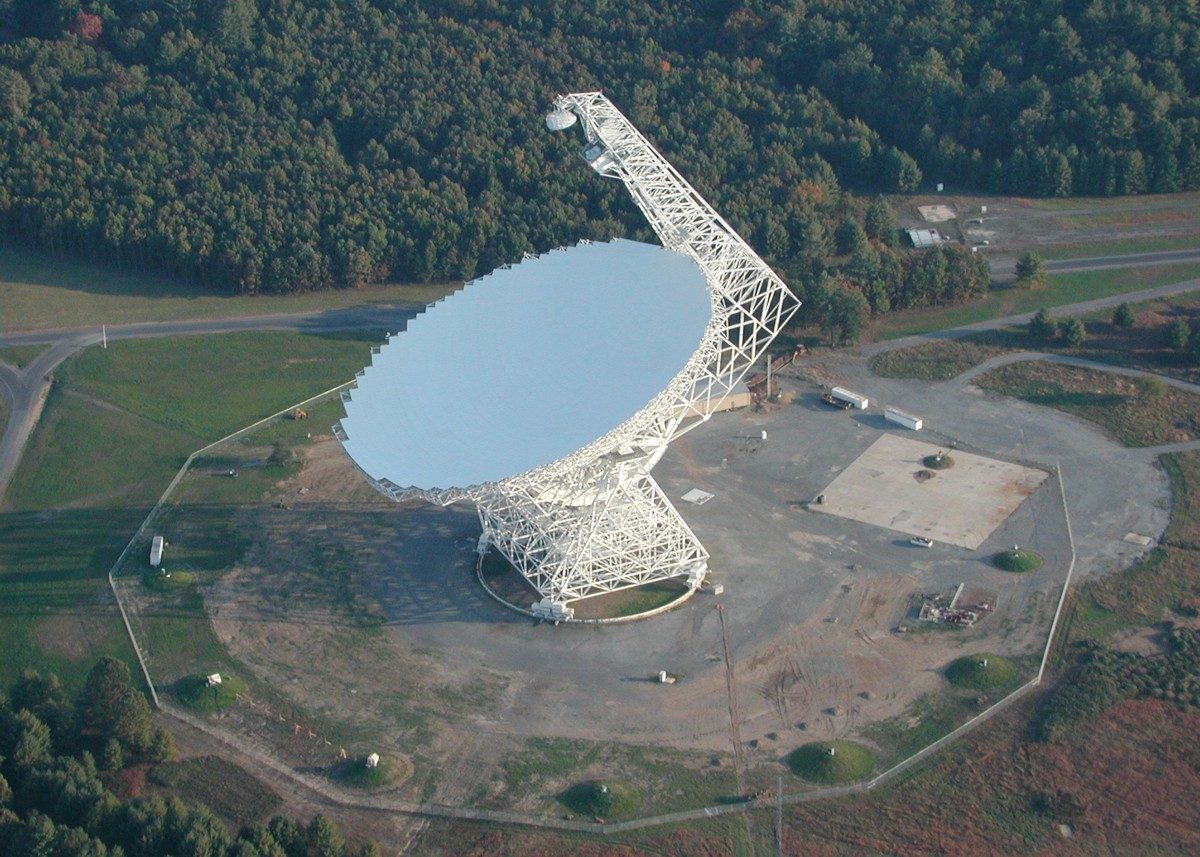
Robert C. Byrd Green Bank Telescope

- 100m Robert C. Byrd Green Bank Telescope
- 140 Foot (43m) Telescope
- 20 Meter Telescope
- 40 Foot Telescope
- One of the CHIME outriggers

== Historic and other telescopes ==
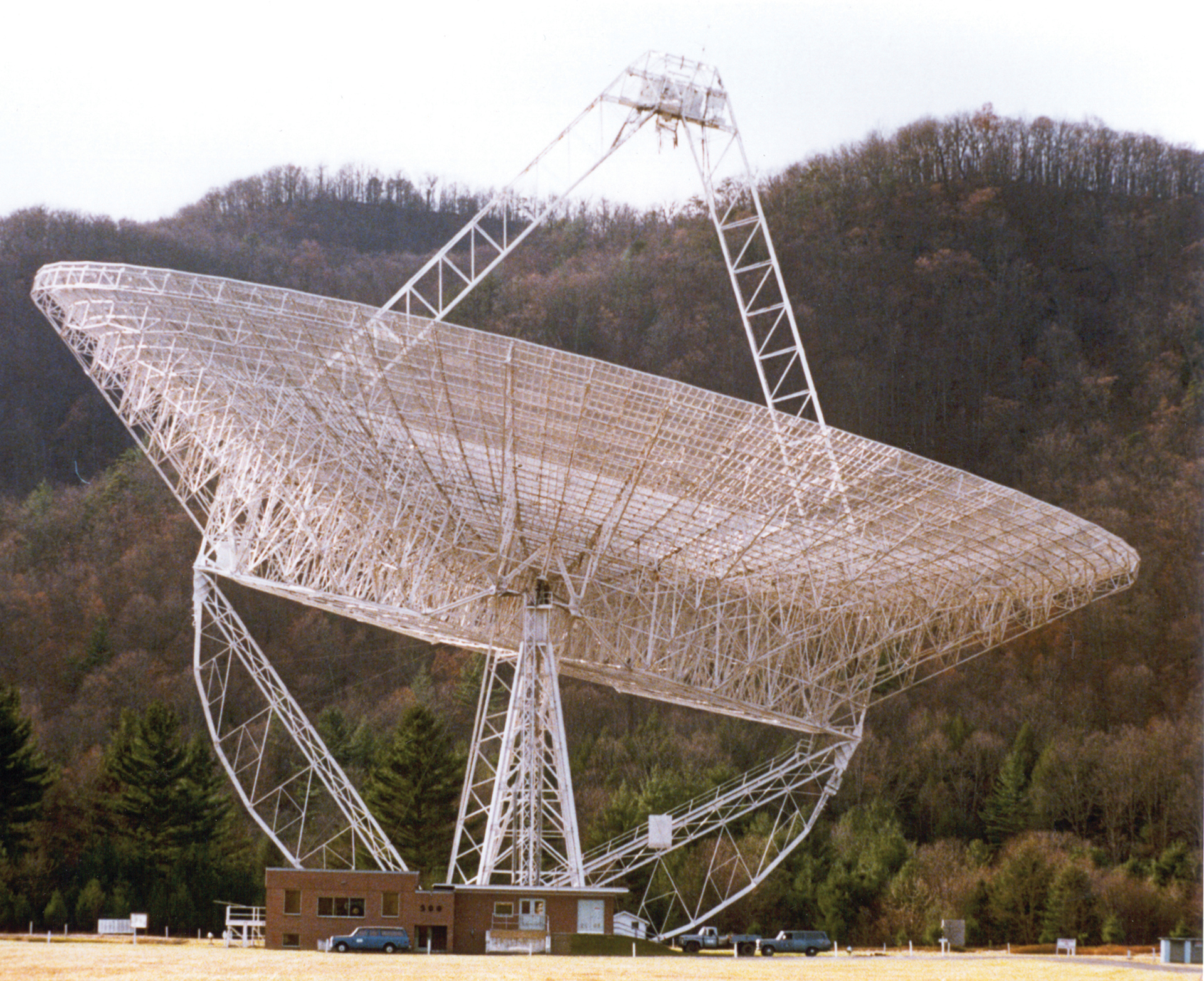
300-ft Telescope day of collapse

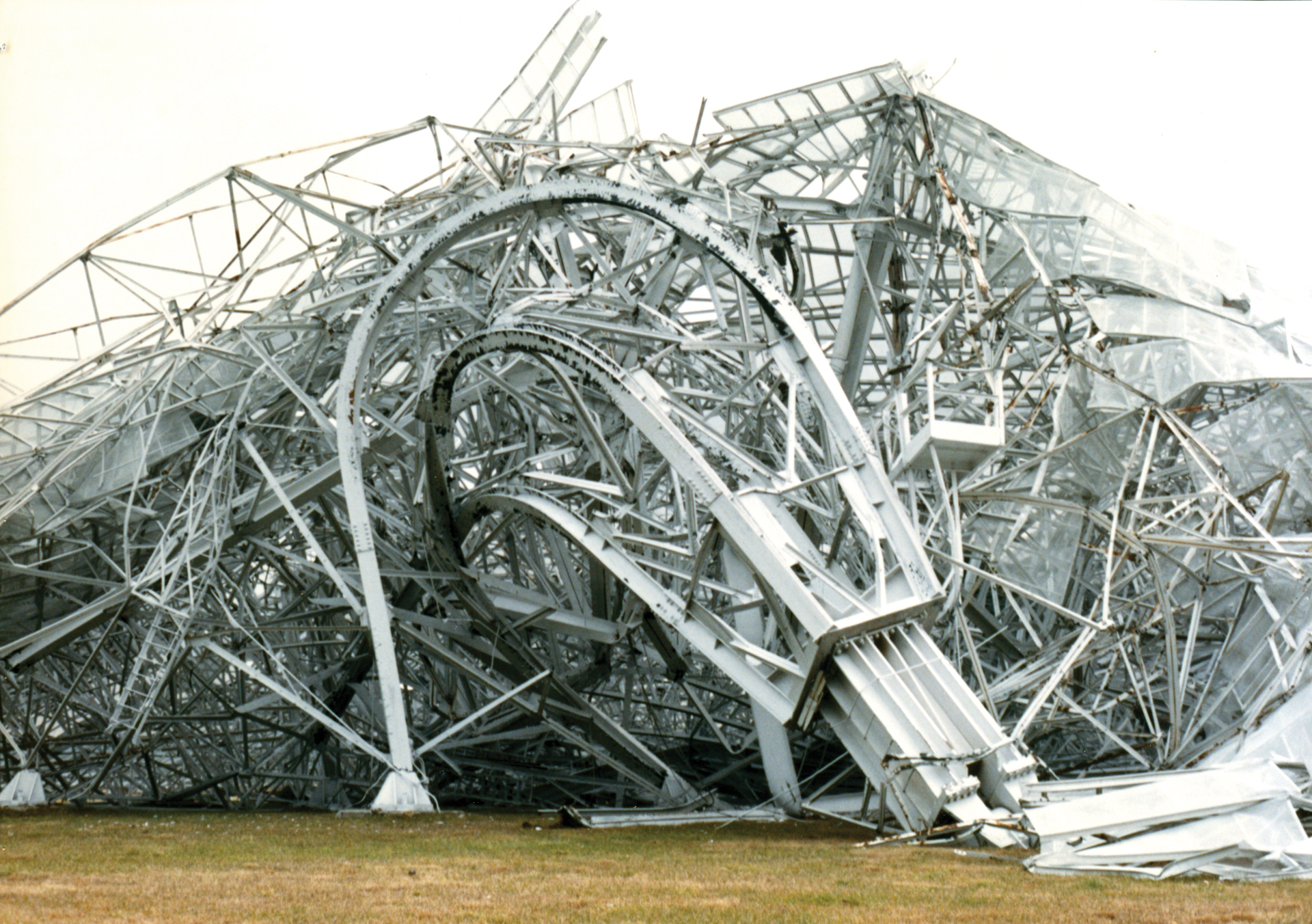
Day after collapse

- 300 Foot Radio Telescope – the world's largest moving telescope, suddenly collapsed in November 1988 from the loss of a gusset plate
- Green Bank Interferometer
- Reber Radio Telescope – designated a National Historic Landmark in 1989
- 85 foot Howard E. Tatel Radio Telescope — utilized in Project Ozma in 1960, the first search for extraterrestrial intelligence (SETI) with a radio telescope
- 45 Foot Telescope

== Popular culture ==
- Green Bank Observatory is a location in Fallout 76, as National Isolated Radio Array.
- The observatory is called Camp Echo One in the 2025 film Captain America: Brave New World, with Captain America entering a radio quiet zone in West Virginia where two telescopes resemble the 140-Foot Green Bank Telescope.
- The observatory's proximity to Sugar Grove Station and The Greenbrier has fueled conspiracies about secretive government connections, with the telescopes rumored to be "anything and everything from a front for CIA operations to a cover for missile silos."
- The 2024 documentary Small Town Universe was shot and set in Green Bank, and the majority of the film takes place within the Green Bank Observatory campus.

== See also ==
- List of astronomical observatories
