= Tetsuo Kogawa =

Japanese media theorist

- 粉川哲夫
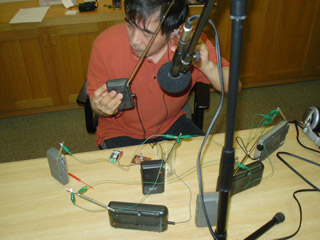
- Kogawa in 2003
- Born: 15 August 1941 (age 84)
- Occupation: performance artist
- Website: anarchy.translocal.jp

Tetsuo Kogawa (粉川哲夫) is a Japanese performance artist, activist and media theorist who works extensively with radio art and microbroadcasting. Until 2012, he worked as a professor in Department of Communication Studies at Tokyo Keizai University, and has written extensively on media philosophy, information technology and film in both Japanese and English.

== Career ==
Kogawa studied a B.A. in philosophy at Sophia University, with a focus on Heidegger, graduating in 1966. He received an M.A. in philosophy from Waseda University, where he developed an interest in the work of Walter Benjamin and Theodor Adorno.

From the late 1970s, Kogawa's work has been focussed on media activism, around a practice in anarchist and open-source micro-radio. The theoretical, technical and collective aspects of his work are strongly related: in 1982, for example, he worked with students attending his phenomenology class at Wako University to set up a low-power FM radio station on campus, named Radio Polybucket. In 1983, Kogawa and his students set up Radio Home Run, a project in the Shimokitazawa neighbourhood of Tokyo. The broadcast range was only a few blocks, meaning listeners could walk to the studio and participate in broadcasts, which on many occasions they did

During this period, Kogawa had a long-running correspondence with media theorist and activist Felix Guattari, interviewing him during his 1980 and 1981 visits to Japan,. and later reviewing the text of New Lines of Alliance, New Spaces of Liberty which Guattari co-authored with Antonio Negri. In his essay Toward a Polymorphous Radio, Kogawa cites Guattari's involvement with the Italian free radio movement as a direct inspiration in his own work. Kogawa is described by professor Toshiya Ueno as having been relatively overlooked in the field of Guattari studies, despite being a very influential figure, particularly in Japan

In addition to theorists such as Guattari, Kogawa cites anarchist movements such the Autonomia movement and the Zapatistas, and their use of new media and network technology. He also has a long-running interest in the work of Franz Kafka, which shaped his initial interest in philosophy, and what he terms "micropolitics".

Kogawa was an invited curator of Machida City Museum of Graphic Arts' 'Art On The Net' project from 1996 to 2001. Since 1988, he has also been the director of the Goethe Archive Tokyo.

== Micro Radio ==
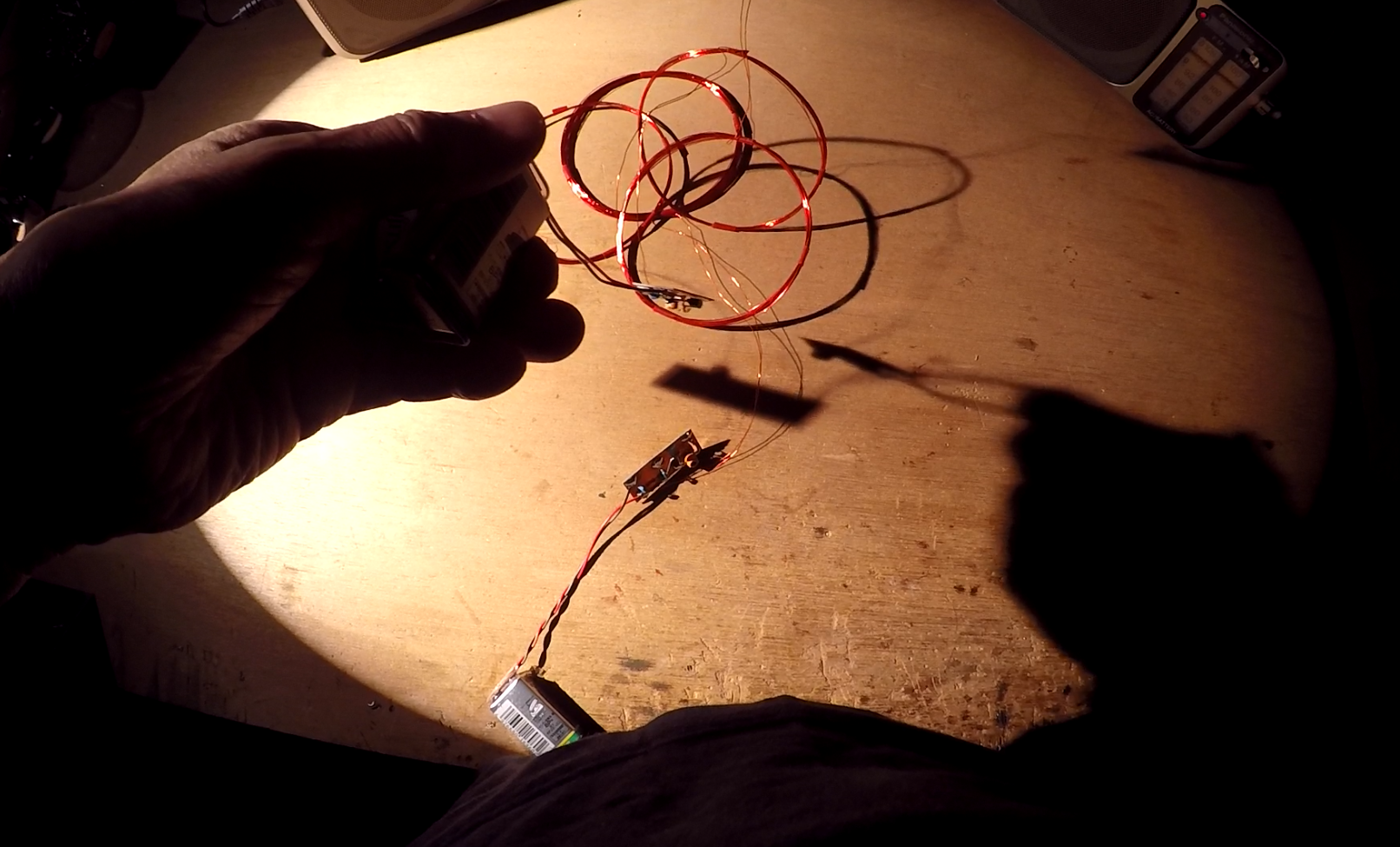
A microtransmitter made by Kogawa for the 2016 RadioRevoluten festival

Much of Kogawa's technical and activist work centres around microbroadcasting and short-range radio transmission. His personal website hosts extensive open-source guides to different construction methods, which have also been reproduced in textbooks. John Mowitt describes Kogawa's workshops in free radio as part of the 'one-watt revolution', where participants 'broadcast from the micropolitical field of everyday life'. In his 2002 essay 'A Micro Radio Manifesto', Kogawa defines the practice as follows:

"What do you intend to say by micro? In the core of the movements, "micro" of micro radio meant something beyond the mere size of transmitting power and service area. It connotes something qualitatively different. micro means diverse, multiple, and polymorphous [...] Micro radio is an alternative to mass medium and global communications that could cover the globe with the qualitatively same and patterned information."

Kogawa is internationally recognised as a pioneer of the micro-radio genre as both an artistic and technical practice, and has worked with institutions including the Barcelona Museum of Contemporary Art,. Wave Farm Radio and Radio Revolten, Halle's international radio art festival
