= Intentional radiator =

Device designed to produce radio waves

An intentional radiator is any device that is deliberately designed to produce radio waves.

Radio transmitters of all kinds, including the garage door opener, cordless telephone, cellular phone, wireless video sender, wireless microphone, and many others fall into this category.

In the United States, intentional radiators are regulated under 47 CFR Part 15, Subpart C.

== See also ==
- LASER
- Spurious emission
- Unintentional radiator (incidental radiator)
- United States energy law
