= Child of Dust =

2020 Polish documentary film

- Official poster
- Polish: Dziecko z Pyłu
- Directed by: Weronika Mliczewska
- Screenplay by: Weronika Mliczewska
- Produced by: Weronika Mliczewska; Chi-Minh De Leo; Bao Nguyen
- Cinematography: Mikael Lypinski
- Edited by: Marcin Sucharski; Mateusz Romaszkan
- Music by: Joaquin Garcia
- Production company: Ya Man Studio
- Release date: 11 March 2025 (TDF)
- Running time: 1 hr. 33 min.
- Countries: Poland, Vietnam, Sweden, Czech Republic, Qatar
- Languages: English, Vietnamese

Child of Dust (Polish: Dziecko z Pyłu) is a documentary film written and directed by Weronika Mliczewska. The film follows Sang Thanh Ngô, an Amerasian man born during the Vietnam War, as he searches for his American father. It is a Poland-Vietnam-Sweden-Czech Republic-Qatar co-production, produced by Mliczewska, Chi-Minh De Leo and Bao Nguyen.

The film was acquired by Berlin-based Rise and Shine World Sales ahead of its Thessaloniki Documentary Festival Premiere, where it received a Special Mention from the documentary competition jury. It won Best International Documentary, Best National Documentary and Best Editing at the 65th Krakow Film Festival in May 2025.

In November 2025, Child of Dust was included among the documentary films deemed eligible for consideration in the Best Documentary Feature category at the 98th Academy Awards.

== Summary ==
Fifty years after the end of the Vietnam War, Sang, the abandoned child of an American soldier, reunites with his father in the U.S., risking his family life in pursuit of healing—but nothing goes as expected.

== Development ==
Mliczewska conceived the idea for the documentary when she was making a short documentary on Esports in Vietnam. There, she learned about DNA testing initiatives helping Amerasian children find their American fathers. She and Vietnamese producer Chi-Minh De Leo spent eight years making Child of Dust. Bao Nguyen later joined the project as a Producer to help bring the film to Vietnamese-American audiences and facilitate its North American outreach.

== Production ==
Child of Dust was supported by several institutions, including the Polish Film Institute, Telewizja Polska, Al Jazeera Documentary, the Czech Audiovisual Fund, the Swedish Film Institute, the Ministry of Culture within the National Recovery Plan, Creative Vouchers Initiative and the European Union’s Next Generation E.U. initiative.

Production was supervised by Mliczewska for Ya Man Studio (Poland), with co-productions by de Leo for Clubhouse Films (Vietnam), Antonio Russo Merenda for Ginestra Film (Sweden), Michal Sikora for Lonely Production (Czech Republic), and Andrzej Łucjanek for FixaFilm. Additional co-producer credit include to Magda Cichecka, while associate producers are Jim Stark, Brian Hjort, Paweł Ziemilski, and Mateusz Wajda.

My background in anthropology allowed me to approach Child of Dust with deep cultural sensitivity, ensuring Sang’s story was told with authenticity and respect. It helped me observe without imposing, allowing moments to unfold naturally rather than shaping them to fit a preconceived narrative.

— Weronika Mliczewska

Mliczewska, who was pregnant during the shoot, took on directing, producing, writing, and filming roles.

Regarding her relationship with the protagonist, Mliczewska stated, "Sang trusted me because, for the first time, someone truly listened. He knew this film could give voice to a forgotten history. I was fortunate to have a strong Vietnamese team who helped build trust and preserve cultural authenticity."

Child of Dust was shot by Mikael Lypinski and edited by Marcin Sucharski and Mateusz Romaszkan, while Joaquin Garcia composed the score.

== Release ==
Child of Dust had its world premiere in the International Competition section at the Thessaloniki Documentary Festival on 12 March 2025. Its German premiere followed on 11 May 2025 at DOK.fest München. On 29 May 2025, the film had its Polish premiere at the Krakow Film Festival, where it won three major awards: Best International Documentary, Best National Documentary, and Best Editing.

The film had its USA premiere at the Chicago International Film Festival, where it was nominated for a Gold Hugo in the Best Documentary category. It won the Audience Award for Best Documentary.

Following its screening at the 2026 Maine International Film Festival, where it won the Audience Favorite Award, Child of Dust received an exclusive U.S. theatrical engagement at the Maine Film Center in Waterville, Maine.

== Reception ==
Child of Dust received a Special Mention at Thessaloniki International Film Festival, where the jury called it "a beautifully shot cinéma vérité portrait" exploring the generational trauma of war and the universal desire for paternal love.

It won Best International Feature Documentary at the Visioni dal Mondo Film Festival in Milan, Italy. The jury described the film as a deeply human and sensitively crafted portrait that conveys both the subject’s personal journey and the depth of her trauma, noting that the director created a powerful and emotionally resonant work that lingers beyond its conclusion.

Child of Dust won the Grand Prize in the New Polish Films Competition at the 2025 Watch Docs International Human Rights Film Festival in Warsaw, Poland. The jury described it as an "emotionally powerful, multi-layered, and intellectually ambitious" documentary, praising its exploration of the intergenerational consequences of war, racial discrimination, and identity through a visually striking and intimate portrait of its protagonist.

In 2026, Child of Dust received nominations for Best Documentary Film and Best Music at the Polish Film Awards.

It also received the JANTAR Award for Best Directing in the Full-Length Documentary Debuts Competition at the 45th Koszaliński Festiwal Debiutów Filmowych Młodzi i Film. The jury praised the film as "an important and deeply moving story" about the search for identity, commending its narrative structure and its portrayal of people "whose voices remain often inaudible and their fate unnoticed."

=== Critical reviews ===
Amber Wilkinson of Screen Daily praised the film, writing, "Sombre but tenderly shot and heartfelt, Mliczewska’s quiet and intimate observational film brims with feeling." She added, "Despite the difficulties faced by Sang and his families in both countries, Mliczewska’s empathetic approach also celebrates the strength that community can offer in these situations, and the small gestures that can have big significance."

Melita Zajc of Modern Times Review wrote that the film "stands out for its exceptional production quality, beginning with outstanding archival material," describing it as a sensitive and deeply human portrait of Sang Ngo Thanh's search for identity. She noted its careful observation of generational trauma and its emotionally resonant depiction of a man navigating the legacy of war across two cultures.

Dierk Streng, writing for the German daily newspaper Berliner Zeitung, described Child of Dust as "a study of trauma and the search for identity that is as precise as it is poetic." He praised Mliczewska's empathetic portrayal of its protagonist, Sang, noting that the film examines emotional trauma without judging its subjects, while commending its cinematography, editing, and its ability to blur the boundary between documentary and narrative cinema.

=== Awards ===
Award	Date of ceremony	Category	Recipient(s)	Result	Ref.
Krakow Film Festival	1 June 2025	International Documentary	Weronika Mliczewska	Won	
Krakow Film Festival	1 June 2025	Polish Documentary	Weronika Mliczewska	Won	
Krakow Film Festival	1 June 2025	Best Editing	Marcin Sucharski and Mateusz Romaszkan	Won	
Thessaloniki Documentary Festival	16 March 2025	International Competition	Weronika Mliczewska	Nominated	
Thessaloniki Documentary Festival	16 March 2025	Special Mention	Weronika Mliczewska	Won	
Visioni dal Mondo Film Festival	14 September, 2025	Best International Feature Documentary	Weronika Mliczewska	Won	
Chicago International Film Festival	25 October, 2025	Audience Award	Weronika Mliczewska	Won	
Chania Film Festival	27 October, 2025	Audience Award	Weronika Mliczewska	Won	
Watch Docs	2025	Grand Prize	Weronika Mliczewska	Won	
Watch Docs	2025	Audience Award	Weronika Mliczewska	Won	
Maine International Film Festival	16 July, 2026	Audience Award	Weronika Mliczewska	Won	
Shanghai TV Festival Magnolia Awards	2026	Best Documentary	Weronika Mliczewska	Won	
DC Independent Film Festival	2026	Best Feature Documentary	Weronika Mliczewska	Won	
Koszaliński Festiwal Debiutów Filmowych Młodzi i Film	2026	Best Director	Weronika Mliczewska	Won	
Polish Film Awards	2026	Best Documentary Film	Weronika Mliczewska	Nominated	
Polish Film Awards	2026	Best Music	Joaquin Garcia	Nominated	
