= Desert Coffee =

2017 Polish documentary film

- Official Poster
- Directed by: Mikael Lypinski
- Screenplay by: Mikael Lypinski
- Produced by: Mikael Lypinski; Piotr Bogucki
- Cinematography: Mikael Lypinski
- Edited by: Jakub Pietrzak
- Music by: Mikołaj Hołówko
- Release date: 30 March 2017 (Krakow)
- Running time: 53 min
- Country: Poland
- Language: English

Desert Coffee is a Polish documentary film written, directed and shot by Mikael Lypinski. The film explores life in Slab City, a remote squatter community in the Sonoran Desert of Southern California. It was shot on a low budget with no crew.

== Summary ==
Slab City is a squatter community in the Sonoran Desert, Southern California. The inhabitants, Slabbers, live in broken trailers or old school buses. Their closest neighbors are the United States Navy and Marine Corps, who practice aerial bombing in the area. Despite living off-grid in extreme weather conditions with no running water, electricity, sewage system or trash pickup, the residents enthusiastically embrace their freedom in the beautiful badlands of the desert.

Rob hates coffee, but the minute dawn breaks he meticulously brews "the best coffee in the country" for his customers in his makeshift internet cafe.

== Release ==
Desert Coffee had its world premiere at the Krakow Film Festival on 30 May 2017, where it competed at the International Documentary Film And Polish National Film category. The film was subsequently screened at several festivals in Poland, including Man in Danger in Łódź, where it was awarded the Grand Prix.

It also screened in the United States at the American Documentary Film Festival in Palm Springs, California and the Spotlight Documentary Film Awards. The film had its Mexican premiere (Spanish: El café del desierto) on 15 October 2018 at the DocsMX Festival in Mexico city, where it received a Special Mention in the "Latitudes humanas" competition.

Desert Coffee was broadcast on UR Play, the streaming platform of Swedish Television, under the title "En fika i öknen." The film was later acquired and released by both Netflix and Disney+ in Europe.

== Reception ==
The jury of the Man in Danger Film Festival awarded Desert Coffee "for its inquisitive and unsentimental portrait of an alternative human community, in which the deliberate limitation of consumer needs prompts us to question our own relationship with the modern world."

=== Critical review ===
Bianca-Olivia Nita of Modern Times Review observed that Desert Coffee "is a portrait that challenges the standard notions of home and belonging, and our ideas of what these should look like" - portraying humanity and freedom coexisting "with poverty and social outcasts." Nita further noted that the film features "standout characters," describing them as "the misfits among misfits" who are portrayed with a sense of humanity, vulnerability, and relatability.

== Awards ==
Award	Year	Category	Result	Ref.
Krakow Film Festival	2017	International Dcoumentary	Nominated	
Krakow Film Festival	2017	Polish Dcoumentary	Nominated	
DocsMx Festival	2018	Jury's Special Mention	Won	
Man in Danger	2018	Grand Prix	Won	
Spotlight Documentary Film Awards	2018	Gold Award	Won	
Impact Docs Awards	2019	Award of Merit Special Mention	Won	
