= Mikael Lypinski =

Swedish-Polish filmmaker and cinematographer

- Born: June 3, 1975 (age 51); Stockholm, Sweden
- Education: Polish National Film School
- Occupations: Filmmaker; Cinematographer

Mikael Lypinski (born June 3, 1975) is a Swedish-Polish filmmaker and cinematographer known for his work in documentary cinema, including Desert Coffee, Child of Dust and The End of Quiet.

== Life and career ==
Lypinski was born and raised in Stockholm, Sweden. He graduated from the Directing Department of The Polish National Film School in Łódź, Poland. In 2017, he was a writer, director and cinematographer on Desert Coffee, which premiered in competition at the Krakow Film Festival and received the Grand Prix-award at Man in Danger.

In 2023, Lypinski directed Unpaved, a documentary portrait of a small off-grid community in the forests of Oregon. He worked as a one-person crew, handling directing, cinematography, and sound recording. The film had its world premiere at the Krakow Film Festival, where it was nominated for three awards, including in the International Competition.

In 2025, he served as cinematographer on Weronika Mliczewska's Child of Dust. He also co-wrote, co-directed, and shot The End of Quiet, a documentary feature that premiered at the Tribeca Film Festival. Lypinski was nominated for Best Cinematography, while the film was also nominated for Best Documentary Feature and the Audience Award, shared with co-writer and co-director Kasper Bisgaard.

== Filmography ==
Year	Film	Role	Notes
2025	The End of Quiet	Director, writer, cinematographer, additional editing	Documentary
2025	Child of Dust	Cinematographer, additional editing	Documentary
2023	Unpaved	Director, writer, cinematographer, producer	Documentary
2020	Catalonian Dream	Cinematographer	Documentary short
2017	Desert Coffee	Director, writer, cinematographer, producer	Documentary
2015	Mr. Steven's Bar	Director, cinematographer, producer, editor	Documentary
1999	My name is Jurek	Director, writer, producer	Short
1998	Trzy dni z zycia malzenskiego	Director, writer	Short
1997	Burning Ambition	Director, cinematographer, editor	Documentary short
1996	No Smoking	Director, cinematographer, editor	Documentary short
