= North Polar Spur =

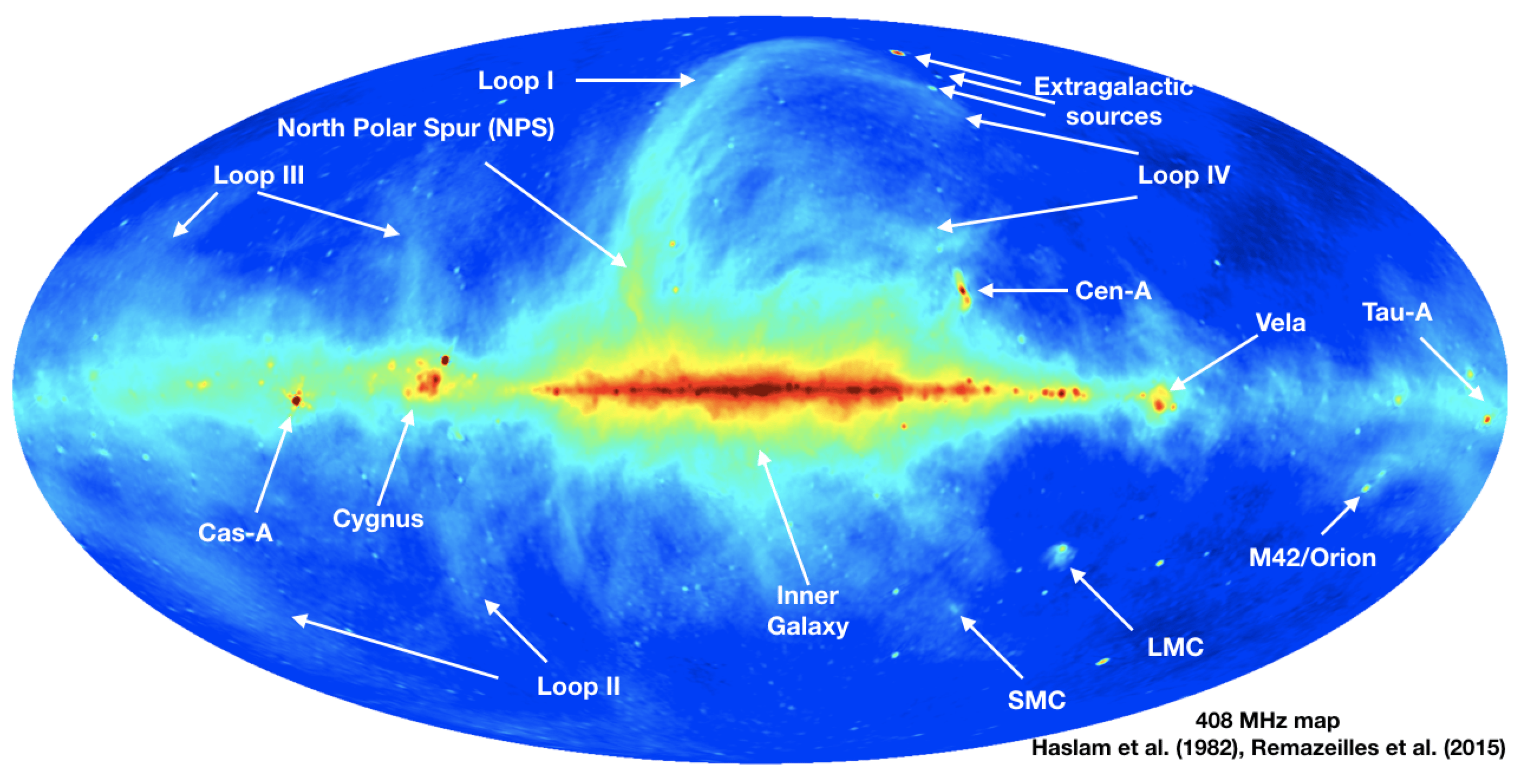
Map of the Milky Way at 408 MHz. The North Polar Spur is indicated

The North Polar Spur is one of the largest structures in the Milky Way galaxy. A giant plume of bright, polarised emission, it extends into the northern galactic hemisphere, roughly perpendicular to the galactic plane. It cannot be seen at optical wavelengths, but is visible through synchrotron radiation at radio and xray wavelengths.

It is thought to be produced by ionised gas in a strong magnetic field. Its size, and distance from Earth, are yet to be established.
