= 3C 293 =

Low ionization nuclear emission-line region galaxy in constellation Canes Venatici

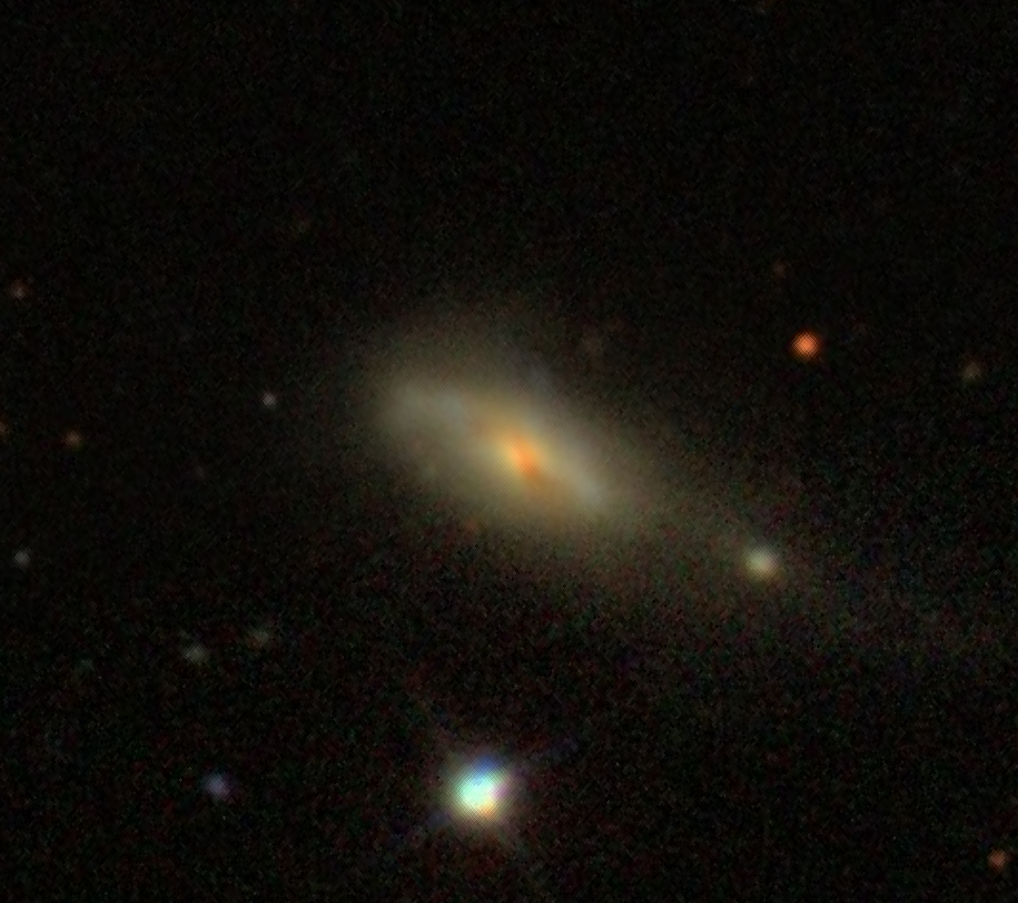
- SDSS image of 3C 293.

Observation data (J2000 epoch)
- Constellation: Canes Venatici
- Right ascension: 13^{h} 52^{m} 17.84^{s}
- Declination: +31° 26′ 45.50″
- Redshift: 0.045194
- Heliocentric radial velocity: 13,549 km/s
- Distance: 677 Mly (207.72 Mpc)
- Apparent magnitude (V): 15.10

Characteristics
- Type: S? LERG
- Size: ~259,000 ly (79.5 kpc) (estimated)

Other designations
- UGC 8782, 4C +31.43, VV 369, CGCG 162-021, MCG +05-33-012, PGC 49258, B2 1350+31, IRAS F13500+3141, HOLM 553A, DA 352, NRAO 0433, CoNFIG 178, NVSS J135217+312646

3C 293 also known as UGC 8782, is a low-ionization nuclear emission-line region (LINER) galaxy located in the constellation of Canes Venatici. The redshift of the galaxy is (z) 0.045 and it was first discovered from the Third Cambridge Catalogue of Radio Sources survey in 1963. It is also designated as 4C 31.43 by the Fourth Cambridge Catalogue and is classified as a Fanaroff-Riley II radio galaxy.

== Description ==
3C 293 is a disk galaxy based on multiwavelength observations. It is described as having a peculiar appearance, a result of a galaxy merger with two close spaced nuclei only separating 870 kiloparsecs from each other. The galaxy has three dust lanes elongated across its central regions at the position angle of 35°. A central dust lane can be seen spitting into two other individual lane features in a southern direction from the nucleus. Bright clumps of diffused filamentary emission are aligned together with the dust lanes. There is a low-surface brightness tidal tail stretching towards a small satellite elliptical galaxy, implying it and the galaxy are interacting. At around 70 kiloparsecs west, the tail goes in a zig-zag pattern and terminates at what appears to be star-forming regions. A second galaxy is seen, however it isn't interacting.

The radio structure appears compact with a Z-shaped morphology. There is a kiloparsec-scale radio core displaying a steep radio spectrum, and dominating over a series of knots regions. The core is connected by radio emission which is formed into a ridge towards a bright hotspot. In addition, the galaxy has two asymmetric radio lobes and a jet on two sides that is depicted as both misaligned and distorted. The jet is shown to have a kinetic power of 2–4 × 10^{43} erg s^{−1}.

Radio studies described 3C 293 as a double-double X-shaped radio galaxy with an inner pair of radio lobes and another pair of outer lobes. The inner pair of lobes are estimated to have a spectral age at least one million years and a small overall linear size of 190 kiloparsecs. Hotspots are also present, indicating the jet has interacted with the surrounding interstellar medium from the galaxy. Further studies have described the inner lobes as having a young compact steep spectrum (CSS) source, making the galaxy display a restarted active galactic nucleus.

The galaxy shows the presence of ionized gas outflows moving outwards at high velocities of 1000 kilometers per seconds with warm gas having a total mass of 1 × 10^{5} M_{☉}. This suggests the jet is responsible for driving the outflows. Detections of neutral hydrogen absorption have been noted in the galaxy via 21-centimeter wavelength observations and by the Very Large Array. In the galaxy's center lies a supermassive black hole with a mass estimated as 1.6 × 10^{8} M_{☉}. The black hole is also said to be accreting at a fast rate with X-ray gas falling towards it.
