= Unintentional radiator =

In United States regulatory law, an unintentional radiator is any device that is designed to use radio frequency electrical signals within itself, or sends radio frequency signals over conducting cabling to other equipment, but is not intended to radiate radio frequency energy. An incidental radiator is a device that can generate radio frequency electrical energy even though it is not intentionally designed to do so. Unintentional and incidental radio frequency radiation can interfere with other electronic devices. In the United States, limits on radiated emissions from unintentional and incidental radiators are established by the Federal Communications Commission. Similar regulations have been promulgated by other governments. Reference is usually made in regulations to technical standards established by organizations such as ANSI, IEC and ITU.

== Example unintentional and incidental radiating devices ==
A computer is a typical example of an unintentional radiator. Radio frequency signals used within the computer circuitry may be unintentionally coupled to the power cord or to an interconnecting cable, which then acts as an antenna.

A radio receiver will often use an intermediate frequency which is detectable outside the radio—the concept behind at least one audience measurement concept for roadside detection of radio stations which passing motorists are listening to.

Examples of incidental radiators include electric motors, transformers, dimmers, and corona from electrical powerlines. Radiated emissions from these commonly create interference on AM radio receivers and on television receivers.

== Regulatory overview ==
In North America, active devices that are characterized as unintentional radiators are governed by Part 15 of the FCC regulations. In Canada, Innovation, Science and Economic Development considers them as interference-causing Equipment. Globally, most domestic regulation of unintentional radiators are based on ITU recommendations.

Generally, this means the device leaks a signal at some level. Microprocessor-controlled appliances, anything with a clock signal, and switching voltage regulators all make some kind of noise, at the repetition frequency and at harmonics. In most countries, government agencies regulate how much leakage is tolerated. This prevents leakage from cable television systems, for example, from interfering with radio communications between aircraft and control towers.

Because it costs money to filter out noise, there is always a balance struck between regulatory compliance and perfect filtering in these devices. Microwave ovens or devices with microprocessors may leak within allowable limits but may generate an undesired signal that interferes with a licensed communications device. It also generally means that users who intentionally radiate signals (TV stations and cell phone companies) can order the device turned off if it interferes with their licensed operations.

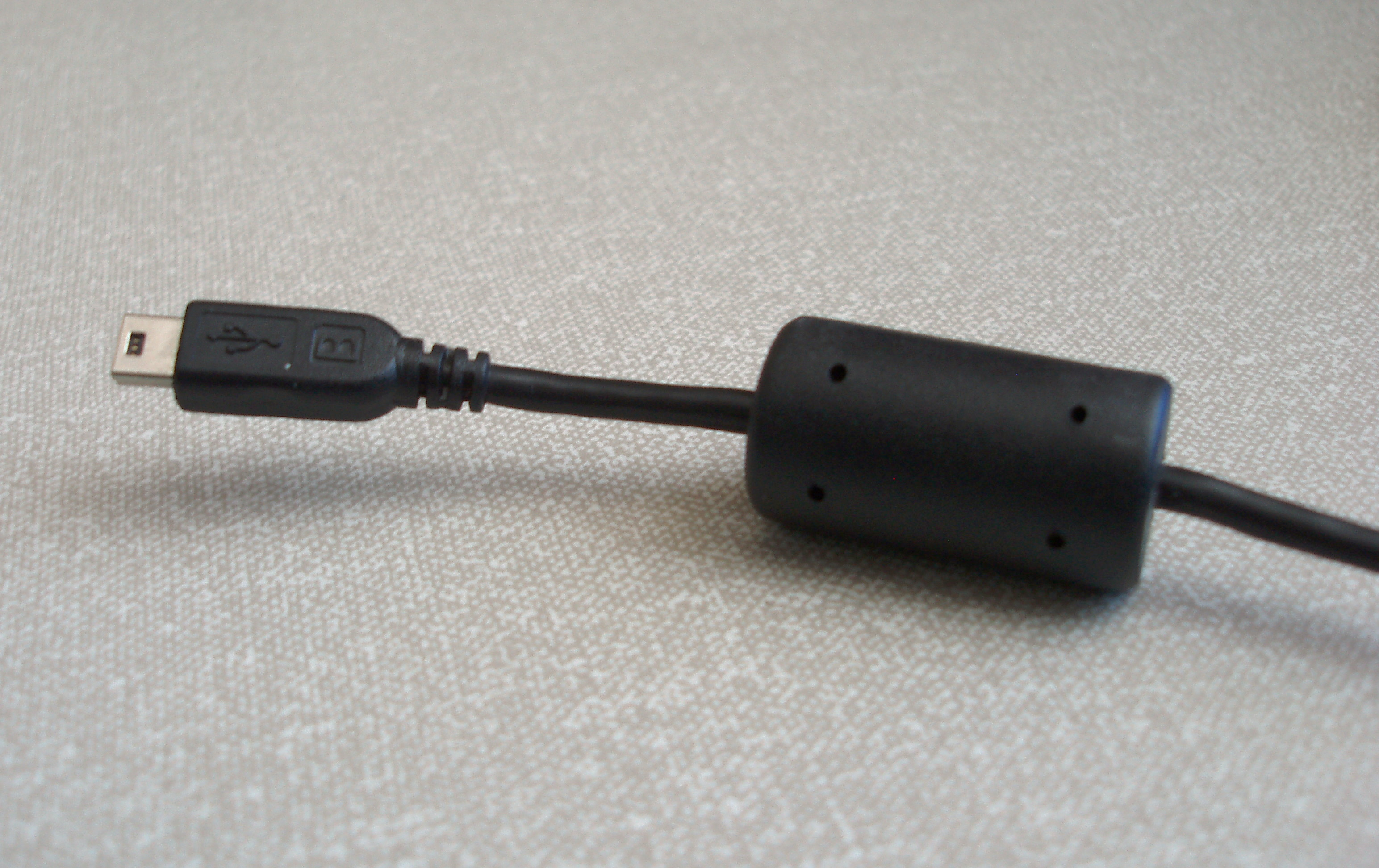
Ferrite bead at the end of a USB cable

There is an entire industry based on regulatory compliance: manufacturers shipping a product to a foreign country must comply with each country's limitations on leakage of interfering signals. For example, in Germany the TÜV issues regulatory rules for unintentional radiators. The big cylindrical bumps on the cable to monitors and laptop chargers are ferrite cores which reduce undesired signals.

== See also ==
- Intentional radiator
- Product certification
