= PKS 1345+125 =

Galaxy merger in the constellation Boötes

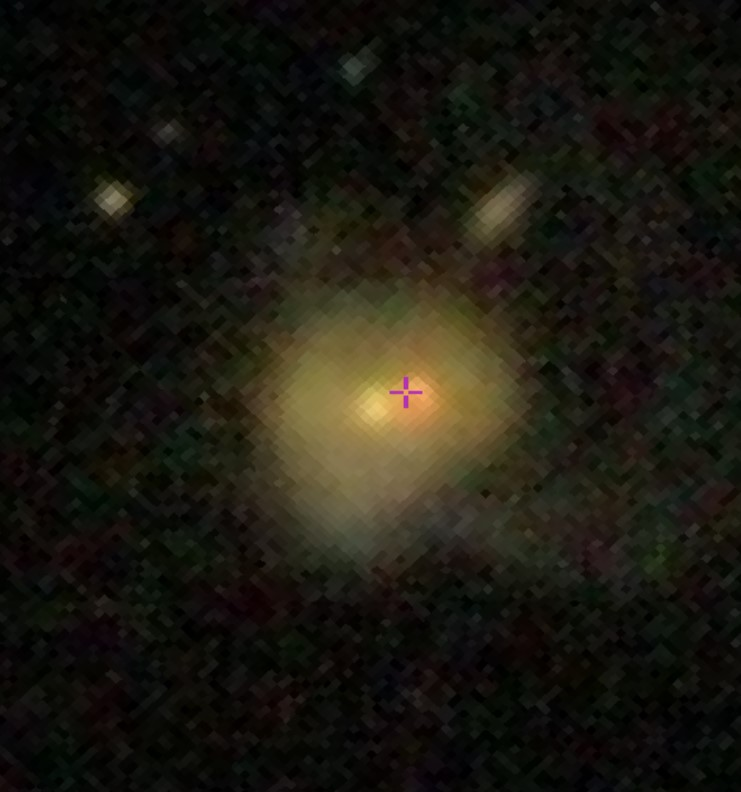
- PKS 1345+125 captured by SDSS

Observation data (J2000.0 epoch)
- Constellation: Boötes
- Right ascension: 13^{h} 47^{m} 33.36^{s}
- Declination: +12° 17′ 24.24″
- Redshift: 0.121740
- Heliocentric radial velocity: 36,497 km/s
- Distance: 1.625 Gly
- Apparent magnitude (V): 0.092
- Apparent magnitude (B): 0.121
- Surface brightness: 16.6

Characteristics
- Type: S0; Double nuc. Sy2
- Size: ~335,000 ly (102.7 kpc) (estimated)
- Notable features: Luminous infrared galaxy, galaxy merger

Other designations
- 4C +12.50, IRAS 13451+1232, PGC 48898, OP +175, NVSS J134733+121724, FIRST J134733.3+121724, GB6 J1347+1217, TXS 1345+125, CoNFIG 177, MRC 1345+125, PKS B1345+125

PKS 1345+125 known as PKS 1345+12 and 4C +12.50, is an ultraluminous infrared galaxy (ULIG) with an active galactic nucleus, located in the constellation Boötes. With a redshift of 0.121740, the galaxy is located 1.62 billion light-years from Earth.

== Characteristics ==
A merger of two gas-rich galaxies consisting of one elliptical and one spiral, PKS 1345+125 is the powerful radio galaxy ever detected in CO (1 → 0) to date with a radio luminosity of P_{408 MHz} = 2.4 × 10^{26} W Hz^{−1}. It presents a compact astrophysical jet that is 0.1" ~200 pc wide, a high molecular gas mass measuring 4.4 × 10^{10} M and contains a gigahertz peaked-spectrum radio source (GPS) within the extent of its narrow-line region (<~1 kpc). Through study of its radio structure, PKS 1345+125 shows a misaligned radio feature of ~49 degrees.

The galaxy is part of a family of "warm" (f_{25 m}/f_{60 m} 0.2, that is similar to the colors of Seyfert galaxies. Such infrared galaxies like PKS 1345+125, are in a transition state between the "cold" (f_{25 m}/f_{60 m} < 0.2) ULIG phenomenon, where active star formation are occurring, with their accretion disks forming around the black hole and in optical quasar phases. This shows molecular gas is used as a fuel source to power its active nucleus.

According to researchers who studied PKS 1345+125, the galaxy contains ratios of narrow optical emission lines; this indicates Seyfert 2 activity. The two nuclei in the galaxy have a projected separation of ≈ 2″ ~ 4 kpc and are surrounded by an extended asymmetrical galactic halo that is detected in both infrared and optical images. These signs shows both black holes are on a verge of merging. Furthermore, a powerful obscured quasar nucleus at wavelengths, is detected with a broad (△v_{FWHM} ~ 2600 km s^{−1}) Pa emission, through recent near-infrared spectroscopic observations.

In addition to narrow optical emission lines, the column densities of N(HI) = (2–7)×10^{18} atoms cm^{−2} in PKS 134+125 is found to have line extent of almost 1000 km/s, indicating large amounts of cold gas present, which is responsible for bending the radio jet. Compared to Arp 220, the infrared and interstellar gas properties are higher in PKS 1345+125.

== Observation of PKS 1345+125 ==
Researchers who studied PKS 1345+125 have suggested the radio source is a prime candidate for the link between young radio galaxies as well as ultraluminous infrared galaxies. From a VLBI study on neutral hydrogen inside nuclear regions of this object, they showed most gas detected close to the systemic velocity, are found to be associated with an off-nuclear cloud ( ~50 to 100 pc from its radio core). Not to mention, the gas has a column density of 10^{22} T_{spin}/100 k cm^{−2} with a H1 mass of 10^{5} to 10^{6} M○.

From the results, researchers hinted the interstellar cloud in PKS 1345+125 has presence of rich and clumpy interstellar medium located inside the centre. Such traces are left over from the merger event that triggered the activity in PKS 1345+125 and growth of the radio source, influenced the medium. The proximity of the gas cloud at the edge of the northern radio lobe according to them, is suggested to be interacting with the radio jet causing it to be bended. The velocity profile of the gas on the other hand, is relatively broad ( ~ 150 km s^{−1}), which researchers interpret this as a sign of kinematical evidence for interaction of the radio plasma with the cloud.

Through imaging with Hubble Space Telescope and long-slit spectra by the William Herschel Telescope at La Plama in Spain, researchers detected young stellar populations in PKS 1345+125 with bright blue knots indicating super star clusters. These star clusters are found to have ages of t_{SSC} < 6Myr with reddenings 0.2 < E(B−V) < 0.5 and solar masses of 10^{6} < M^{YSP}_{SSC} < 10^{7}M_{solar}. The young stellar populations meanwhile, are in diffuse light that are stretched across the full extent of the halo with relatively young age of ~5 Myr. Researchers also studied the locations of super star clusters. The long-slit spectra shows they are moving at 450 km^{−1} in respect to local ambient gas; this is proven they either formed through fast moving gas streams infalling back to the galaxy's nuclear regions or by jet-induced star formation.

== Radio source ==
The radio source in PKS 1345+125 is found to be a compact symmetric source according to researchers who observed it in optical and infra-red images. An extended line emission around ~20kpc, is said to be consistent with the asymmetric halo of diffuse emission. In its nucleus, 3 Gaussian components (narrow, intermediate and broad) are located. The broadest component (FWHM ~2000 km/s) is blue shifted by ~2000 km/s with respect to the galaxy halo and HI absorption, which they interpret it as material outflow.

Researchers further found evidence for high reddening and measure E(B−V)>0.92 for the broadest component in PKS 1345+125. From value of [S II]6716,6731, the electron densities of N_{e}<150 cm^{−3}, N_{e}>5300 cm^{−3} and N_{e}>4200 cm^{−3} are then estimated for all regions. According to them, total mass of line emitting gas is calculated as M_{gas}10^{6} solar masses. This proves PKS 1345+125 is a young radio source with nuclear regions covered by gas and dust cocoons.

== Outflow of PKS 1345+125 ==
The total kinetic outflow in PKS 1345+125 is 8 solar masses per year, thanks to researchers who measured electron densities of N_{e}=2.94×10^{3} cm^{−3}, N_{e}=1.47×10^{4} cm^{−3} and N_{e}=3.16×10^{5} cm^{−3} for the narrow, broad and very broad region components. But only a small fraction (0.13% of Lbol) of the accretion power available are driving the warm outflows. This is significantly less compared to accretion power required by majority of quasar feedback models. Although the model predicted the gas is removed through active galactic nucleus outflows from the host galaxy, the warm outflow is unable to do so. Possibly most of the outflow is either trapped by a dusty cocoon or in hotter or colder phrases. This result is not only important for studying young radio sources but for active galactic nuclei.
