= Small Town Universe =

2024 documentary film

- Directed by: Katie Dellamaggiore
- Produced by: Katie Dellamaggiore; Nelson Dellamaggiore; Tracie Holder
- Production company: Rescued Media
- Release date: 6 April 2024 (Cleveland International Film Festival)
- Running time: 90 minutes
- Country: USA
- Language: English

Small Town Universe is a 2024 documentary film that explores the meditative aspects of life, memory, and isolation in a quiet rural community, Green Bank, West Virginia, where time feels suspended and the ordinary reveals cosmic depth.
