= Weronika Mliczewska =

Polish filmmaker

- Born: October 12, 1986 (age 39); Poland
- Education: Warsaw University; Goldsmiths, University of London
- Occupations: Filmmaker; Anthropologist; Author

Weronika Mliczewska is a Polish filmmaker, anthropologist and author. She is best known for writing, directing and producing the feature-length documentary Child of Dust, which won the International Competition and Polish Competition at the 65th Krakow Film Festival.

== Early life and education ==
Mliczewska was born in Katowice, Poland, in 1986. She studied Cultural Studies at the Warsaw University, and anthropology and directing at Goldsmiths, University of London. She further honed her skills in photography and filmmaking at UCLA extensions in Los Angeles.

== Career ==
Mliczewska, trained in anthropology, set out in her early twenties on a solo journey through Central America, where she lived among Mayan communities. She later chronicled this experience in her nonfiction book "Na początku jest koniec. Na szlakach duchowości Majów" (In the Beginning There Is the End. On the Spiritual Trails of the Maya), which captures her anthropological exploration of the contemporary Maya world.

In 2016, she directed the short documentary Speechless in Japan, a participatory portrait of a cross-dressing Japanese man living on the margins of society. The film, which premiered at the Asian American International Film Festival, explored themes of solitude, identity, and societal judgment.

Mliczewska's medium-length directorial debut was the documentary Long Way, co‑financed by the Polish Film Institute, which premiered at the Krakow Film Festival in 2017. The film was inspired by a personal journey that began when Mliczewska photographed a mysterious woman from India by the Jordan River in Israel. Years later, Mliczewska embarked on a trip to India to find her.

In 2025, Mliczewska served as writer, director, and producer on her feature documentary, Child of Dust. The film follows Sang Thanh Ngô-a Vietnam War Amerasian—on a journey to reunite with his biological father. The project took eight years to complete and involved filming in Vietnam and the United States. It had its world premiere at the Thessaloniki Documentary Festival, where it received a Special Mention, and won the International Competition and Polish Competition at the 65th Krakow Film Festival.

== Filmography ==
Year	Film	Director	Producer	Writer	Note	Ref.
2015	The Circle	Yes	Yes	Yes	Short	
2016	Speechless in Japan	Yes	Yes	Yes	Short	
2017	Długa droga (English: Long Way)	Yes	Yes	Yes		
2020	Catalonian Dream	Yes	Yes	Yes	Short	
2025	Child of Dust	Yes	Yes	Yes		
