= Microbroadcasting =

Low power FM/AM transmissions

Microbroadcasting is the process of broadcasting a message to a relatively small audience. This is not to be confused with low-power broadcasting.

Microbroadcasting, in radio terms, is the use of low-power transmitters (often Title 47 CFR Part 15 in the United States, or its equivalent elsewhere) to broadcast a radio signal over the space of a neighborhood or small town. Similar to pirate radio broadcasting, microbroadcasters generally operate without a license from the local regulatory body, but sacrifice range in favor of using legal power limits (for example, 100 mW for medium wave broadcasts in the United States). Higher power levels can be achieved using carrier current techniques, which are widely used in colleges and universities. Both AM and FM bands are used, although AM tends to have better propagation characteristics at low power.

Microbroadcasting is also used by schools and businesses to serve just the immediate campus of the operation; well-known uses include audio tour guide systems, airport information services, and drive-in theaters, which often provide movie audio over the driver's car audio system. It has also been adopted as an advertising technique, particularly by car dealers and real estate agents.
