= Green Bank, West Virginia =

Village in West Virginia, US

Green Bank
- Census-designated place
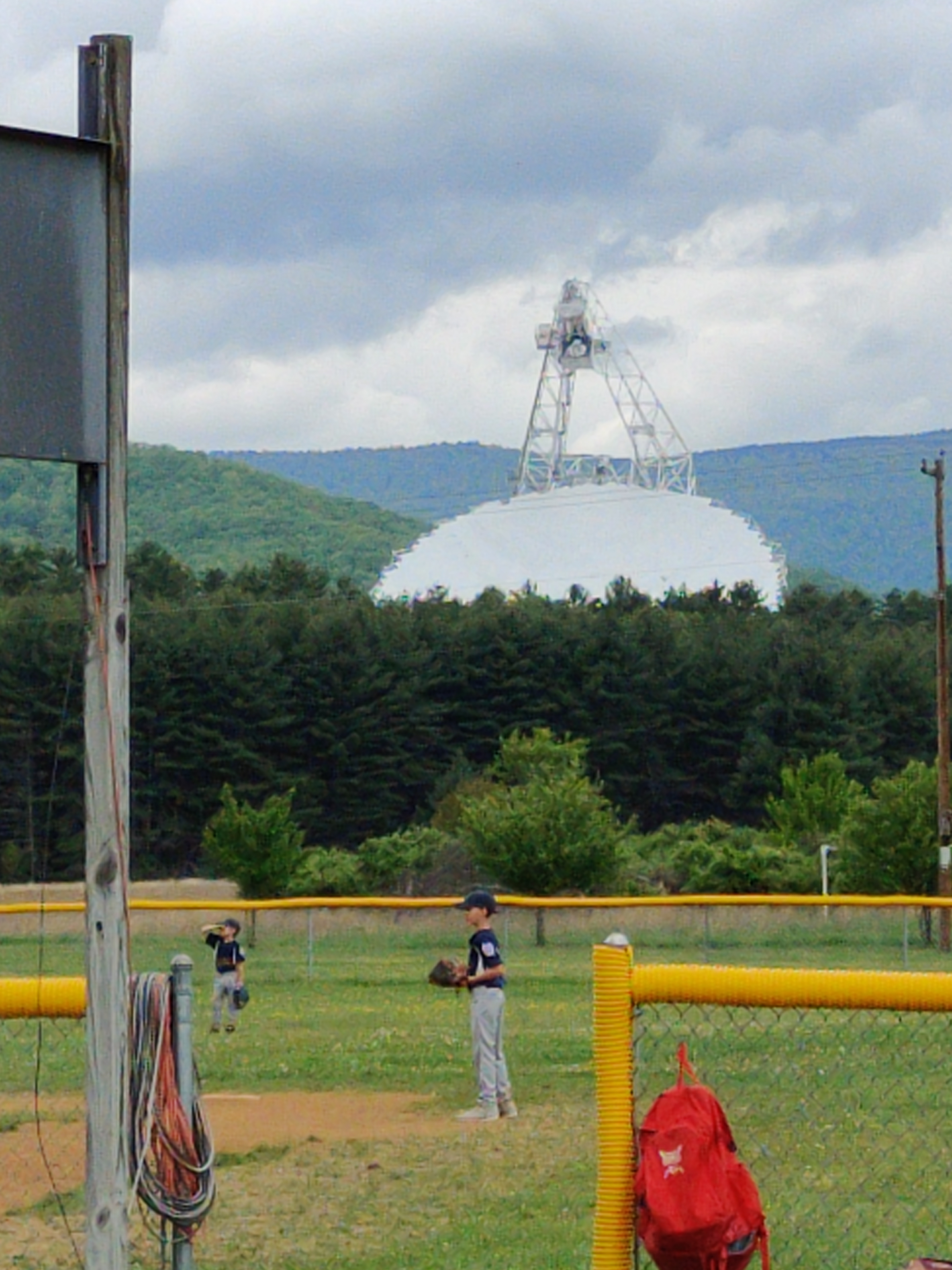
- Green Bank in 2023

- Location within the state of West Virginia
- Coordinates: 38°25′12″N 79°49′53″W
- Country: United States
- State: West Virginia
- County: Pocahontas

Area
  - Total: 3.276 sq mi (8.48 km^{2})
  - Land: 3.276 sq mi (8.48 km^{2})
  - Water: 0 sq mi (0 km^{2})

Population (2020)
  - Total: 141
  - Density: 43.0/sq mi (16.6/km^{2})
- Time zone: UTC-5 (Eastern (EST))
  - Summer (DST): UTC-4 (EDT)
- ZIP codes: 24944

Green Bank is a census-designated place in Pocahontas County in West Virginia's Potomac Highlands inside the Allegheny Mountain Range. Green Bank is located along WV 28. Green Bank is home to the Green Bank Observatory and is also close to the Snowshoe Mountain ski resort. As of the 2020 census, its population was 141.

The community was named for a green riverbank near the original town site.

== National Radio Quiet Zone ==
Green Bank is located within the National Radio Quiet Zone, which means that radio transmissions are heavily restricted by law. This policy is enforced by a "radio policeman" who uses specialized equipment to detect signals from unauthorized electronics. Green Bank is home to the Green Bank Telescope, the world's largest fully steerable radio telescope, which was operated by the National Radio Astronomy Observatory (NRAO) until September 30, 2016. Since October 1, 2016, the Telescope has been operated by the Green Bank Observatory, which is no longer part of the NRAO. It was at the Green Bank Site in 1961 that Frank Drake presented the Drake Equation, which was developed to provide an estimate of the total number of detectable extraterrestrial civilizations in the Milky Way galaxy.

As Green Bank is located within the National Radio Quiet Zone, many people who believe they suffer from electromagnetic hypersensitivity, a disputed medical condition, are finding new homes within its borders. Escape from cellular radiation is the main attraction to Green Bank for these people. As of 2013, around 30 people had moved to Green Bank to escape the supposed effects of electromagnetic hypersensitivity.

== In popular culture ==
- In 2016, Youtuber Tom Scott filmed an informational video covering the Green Bank Telescope and the surrounding Quiet Zone for his Amazing Places series.
- In 2016, German director Werner Herzog's documentary Lo and Behold, Reveries of the Connected World did several interviews with citizens of Green Bank about life without technology, including those claiming to have electromagnetic hypersensitivity seeking refuge in the quiet zone.
- In 2018, the video game Fallout 76, features Green Bank and the Green Bank Observatory as a location under National Isolated Radio Array.
- In 2024, the documentary Small Town Universe was shot and set in Green Bank.
- In 2025, the Camp Echo One scenes, in the film Captain America: Brave New World, take place in Green Bank.
- In 2025, the documentary The End of Quiet, directed by Kasper Bisgaard and Mikael Lypinski, was set in Green Bank. Filming took place during two visits to Green Bank in 2019 and 2022.

== Notable people ==
- Bruce Bosley (1933–1995), American football player
