= Title 47 CFR Part 15 =

FCC rules and regulations on unlicensed transmissions

Code of Federal Regulations, Title 47, Part 15 (47 CFR 15) is an oft-quoted part of Federal Communications Commission (FCC) rules and regulations regarding unlicensed transmissions. It is a part of Title 47 of the Code of Federal Regulations (CFR), and regulates everything from spurious emissions to unlicensed low-power broadcasting. Nearly every electronics device sold inside the United States radiates unintentional emissions, and must be reviewed to comply with Part 15 before it can be advertised or sold in the US market.

== Subparts ==
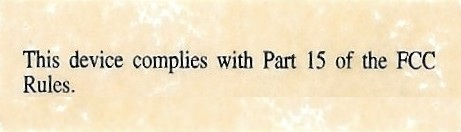
Label on device stating it complies with Part 15 of the FCC Rules

=== A - General ===
Subpart A includes 21 sections from 15.1 to 15.38.

47 CFR 15.1 states that any radiator (that which emits radio energy), whether or not intentional, must be licensed unless it meets 47 CFR 15 or is otherwise exempted by the FCC.

47 CFR 15.3 the definitions are defined by the definition given.

47 CFR 15.5 contains a general provision that devices may not cause interference and must accept any interference received. You are cautioned that any changes or modifications to devices not expressly approved by the party responsible for compliance may void your authority to operate devices.

47 CFR 15.5 prohibits intentional damped wave transmissions such as spark-gap transmitters which were common before the 1920s but occupy a needlessly wide range of frequencies.

47 CFR 15.9 prohibits operating a device under Part 15 for the purpose of eavesdropping, except when under lawful authority of law enforcement or when all parties in a conversation consent.

=== B - Unintentional radiators ===
Subpart B deals with unintentional radiators—devices for which the purpose is not to produce radio waves, but which do anyway, such as computers. There are 16 sections between 15.101 and 15.123.

=== C - Intentional radiators ===
Subpart C deals with devices that are specifically designed to produce coherent radio waves, such as small transmitters. Specific to broadcasting, 15.221 (and 15.219) deal with the AM band; & 15.239 deals with the FM band. 15.247 covers most Wi-Fi frequencies that aren't U-NII.

=== D - Unlicensed PCS devices ===
Sections 15.301 to 15.323 deal with unlicensed PCS devices from 1.91 to 1.93 GHz.

Cordless telephones using DECT 6.0 standards use this unlicensed PCS band.

=== E - Unlicensed NII devices ===
15.401 to 15.407 deal with unlicensed National Information Infrastructure (U-NII) devices

=== F - Ultra-wideband operation ===
15.501 to 15.525 deal with ultra-wideband (UWB) devices, including ground-penetrating radar.

=== G - Access Broadband over Power Line ===
15.601 to 15.615 deal with broadband over power lines (BPL) devices operating in the 1.705–80 MHz band over medium- or low-voltage lines.

=== H - Television Band Devices ===
15.701 to 15.717 deal with (TVBDs), TV-band devices that operate on an available television channel in the broadcast television band. An available channel is a 6 megahertz television channel that is not being used by an authorized service in a given geographical location, and thus may be used by unlicensed devices under the provisions of this rule part.

== Subjects ==
=== Unintentional radiators ===
Unintentional radiators are designated in two major classes:

- Class A Device marketed for use in business/industrial/commercial environments.
- Class B Device marketed for use in a residential environment, notwithstanding use in industrial or commercial environments

The emission limits for Class B devices are about 10 dB more restrictive than those for Class A devices since they are more likely to be located closer to radio and television receivers.

These devices include personal computers and peripheral devices, and electrical ballasts for fluorescent lights.

=== Unlicensed broadcasting ===
On the standard AM broadcast band, under 15.219, transmission power is limited by 100 milliwatts of DC input power to the final RF stage (with restrictions on size, height of, and type of antenna), or alternatively, under 15.221, if the AM transmission originates on the campus of an educational institution, the transmission can theoretically be any power so long as it does not exceed the field strength limits stated in 15.209 at the perimeter of the campus, 24,000/f_{kHz} μV/m.

Unlicensed broadcasts on the FM broadcast band (88 to 108 MHz) are limited to a field strength of 250 microvolts per meter (~48 dBμ) measured at a distance of 3 meters. This corresponds to a maximum effective radiated power of 0.01 microwatts. Emissions must be kept within the 88.0 to 108.0 MHz band under 15.239 rules.

Unlicensed broadcasts on the TV broadcast bands are prohibited, except for certain medical telemetry devices, wireless microphones, and other low power auxiliary stations. 87.5 to 88.0 MHz is considered part of the VHF TV low band. For TV, 15.241 and 15.242 deal with high VHF (channels 7 to 13), 15.242 also deals with UHF (band IV and band V).

=== Common uses of Part 15 transmitters ===
Frequently encountered types of "Part 15" transmitters include:

- 802.11 wireless LANs: (e.g. WiFi): 2.4 GHz, 5 GHz (U-NII)
- 802.15 PANs (e.g. Bluetooth, Zigbee): 2.4 GHz
- Cordless phones: 900 MHz; 1.9 (U-PCS), 2.4, 5 GHz (U-NII)
- Microbroadcasting, often by hobbyists, drive-in theaters, or on college or high school campuses.
- Small FM radio transmitters designed to hook to the audio output of an iPod or other portable audio device and broadcast the audio so that it can be heard through a car audio system that is not equipped with an audio input.
- Very low power transmitters, often referred to as "talking roadsign", "talking houses" or "talking billboards", which will air a repeating loop of highway construction, traffic, promotional or advertising information (see Travelers' information station). These transmitters typically operate on empty channels on the AM broadcast band. A sign placed near the transmitter is used to entice passersby (nearly always in automobiles) to tune in. The talking house gets its name from the fact that such transmitters are installed at houses that are on sale, thus enabling a passerby to learn features of the interior of the house without touring the building.
- Some wireless microphones and headsets that broadcast to a receiver which amplifies the audio. Wireless microphones allow the user to move about freely, unlike a conventional microphone and are thus popular with musicians. Some professional wireless microphones and 'low power auxiliary' stations (including those labeled as "UHF") are licensed under Part 74, Subpart H of the FCC's rules. However, as of January 2010, many professional wireless microphones, and other Part 74 certified 'low power auxiliary' stations with a 50 mW output or less, can be operated in the "core TV band" (TV channels VHF 2-13 and UHF 14-51, except 37) frequencies without a license under a waiver of Part 15 rules. This waiver is expected to become permanent. Units using the high UHF channels (700 MHz band) revoked from the TV bandplan in June 2009 became illegal to operate in June 2010.
- Toys such as the popular late-1970s Mr. Microphone and its imitators, which would broadcast the user's voice to a nearby radio receiver. Variations on this type of transmitter were advertised for sale in radio magazines as far back as the 1920s.
- Walkie talkies intended for children's use, baby monitors, and some older cordless phones operate on frequencies in the 49 MHz band or at the upper end of the AM broadcast band.
- Remote controls for various toys, garage door openers, etc. These transmitters usually operate in the 27, 72-76, or 315-433 MHz ranges; data stream duty cycle has to be limited due to certain transmit power requirements. However, some remote control devices operate under Part 95 of the FCC rules, which permit higher transmit power on the 26/27 MHz and 72 MHz/75 MHz bands. Lower cost devices on these bands (particularly in the 27 MHz, 49 MHz, 310 MHz, 315 MHz and 433 MHz bands) are regulated under Part 15.

=== Spurious emissions ===
Electronic equipment from computers to intentional transmitters can produce unwanted radio signals and are subject to FCC regulation. For digital devices including computers and peripherals, FCC Class B is the more stringent standard, applying to equipment marketed for use in the home, even if it could be used elsewhere. Home users are likely to be annoyed by interference to TV and radio reception. Class A is a looser standard for equipment intended only for business, industrial and commercial settings.

Transmitters also must adhere to a spectral mask, to prevent adjacent-channel interference, intermediate frequency interference, and intermodulation.

== See also ==
- Carrier current
- TEMPEST
- Microbroadcasting
- RSS-210, the equivalent Industry Canada law specifying ultra-low-power license-exempt radio broadcasting devices.
