= Green Bank Interferometer =

Former radio telescope in Green Bank, West Virginia

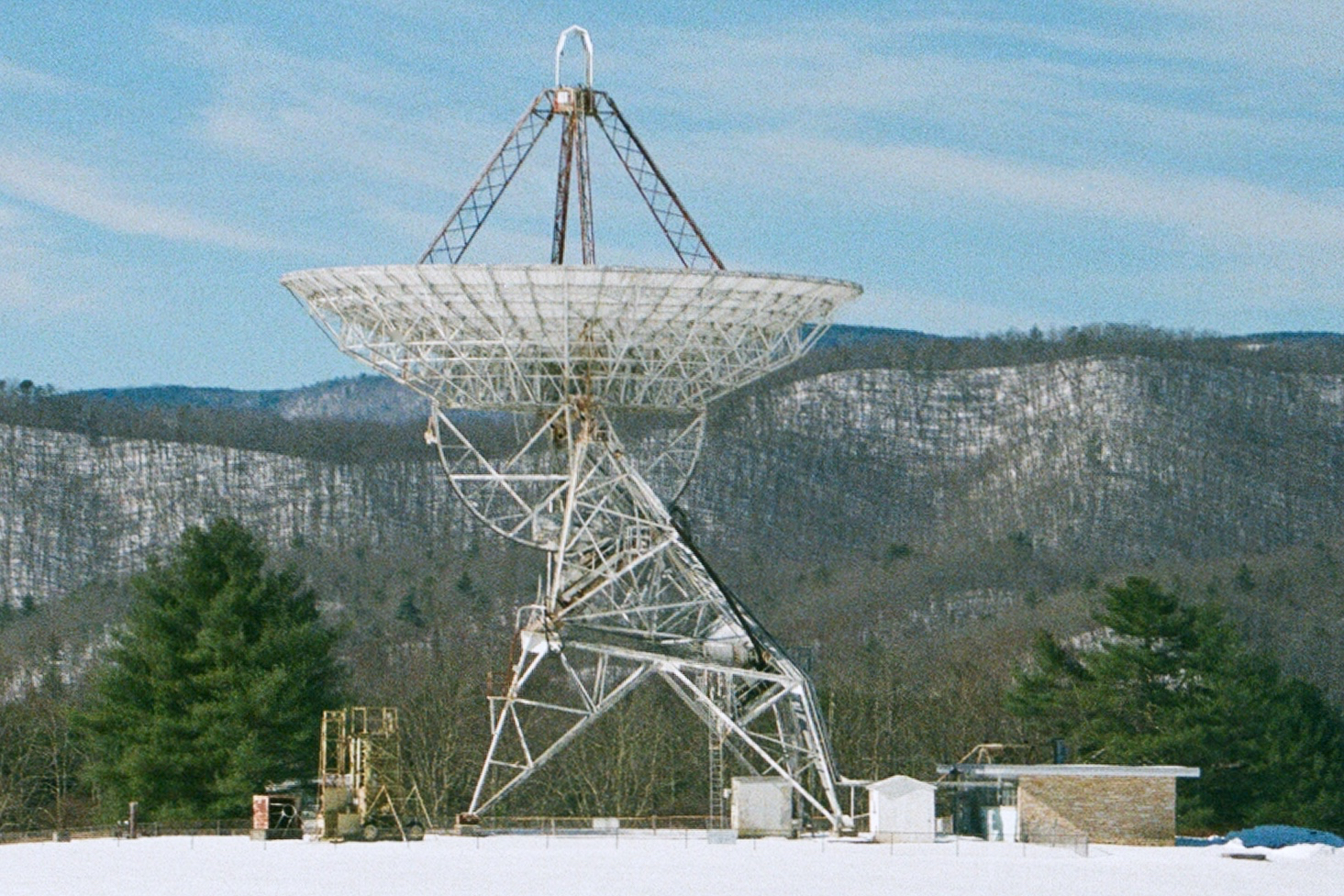
- Howard E. Tatel Radio Telescope (85-1), the first element of Green Bank Interferometer
- Location(s): Green Bank, Pocahontas County, West Virginia
- Coordinates: 38°25′58″N 79°50′22″W
- Location within West Virginia
- Related media on Commons

The Green Bank Interferometer (GBI) is a former radio astronomy telescope located at Green Bank, West Virginia, U.S., and operated by the National Radio Astronomy Observatory. It included three on-site radio telescopes of 85-foot (26m) diameter, designated 85-1, 85-3, and 85-2 (85-1 is also known as the Tatel Telescope) and a portable telescope.

== History ==
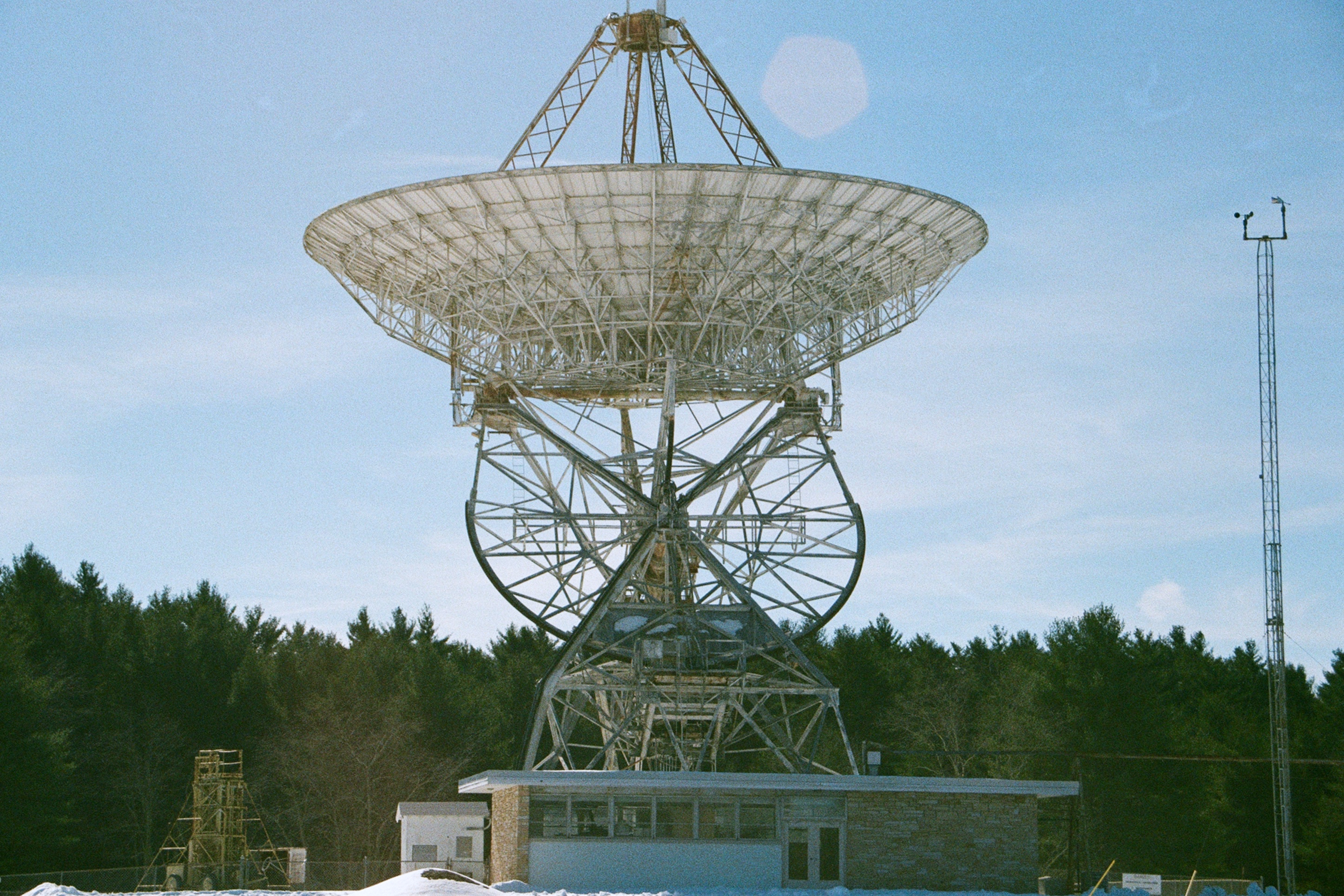
85-1 telescope

The first telescope (85-1, Tatel) was built in 1959 at a fixed location. It was used in Project Ozma in 1960 without interferometer. In 1963, in anticipation of adding movable telescopes for the interferometer, the second 85-foot (26 m) telescope kit identical to 85-1 was ordered. The construction of the second telescope (85-2) was completed in 1964 along with a 1.5-mile (2.4 km) track from 85-1. At that time, the 85-2 telescope was placed at the end of the track and cables were connected between the two telescopes. The GBI began operation that year as a two element interferometer in order to test large aperture synthesis arrays and study radio astrometry and interstellar scintillation.

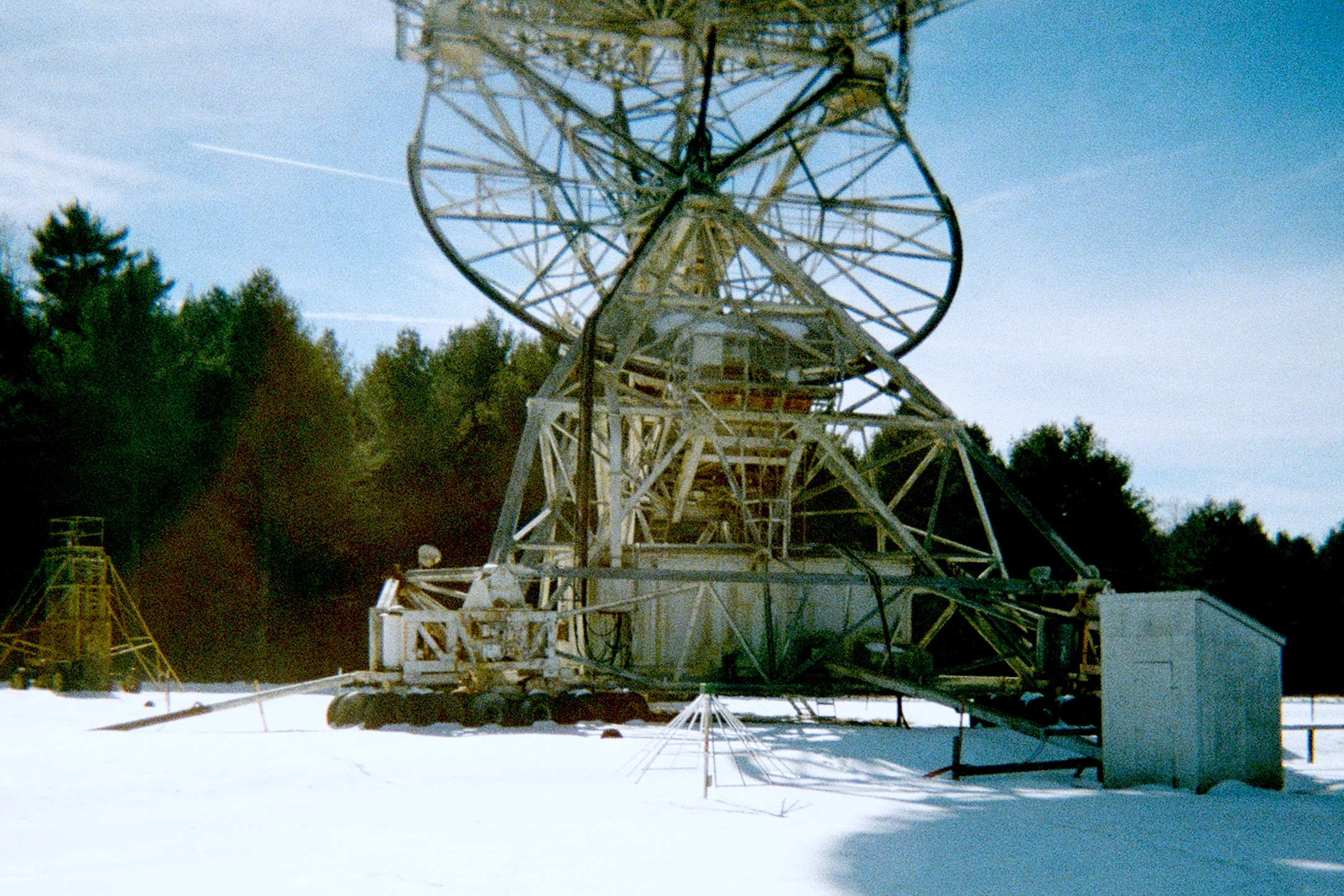
85-3 movable telescope with truck tires to allow it to move along the track

In 1967 the array was upgraded with construction of the third element (85-3) to be located in the middle of the track. Both 85-2 and 85-3 had truck tires mounted on either side to allow them to be moved along the track to test different baselines. The limitation of the 3-element interferometer along a short track became apparent. A 42-foot (13 m) portable telescope was procured. The portable telescope was placed 8 miles (13 km) away from Green Bank site and then moved to 11 miles (18 km) forming a T shape with the length of the bottom arm of the T to be similar to the length of each arm of the Y configuration at Karl G. Jansky Very Large Array (VLA) which was still in a design phase. The portable telescope was later placed on a mountaintop in Huntersville, West Virginia, 26 miles (42 km) away from Green Bank, which is the same distance of the longest baseline of VLA. The portable telescope was replaced in 1973 with 45-foot (14 m) portable telescope which was in use until 1983.

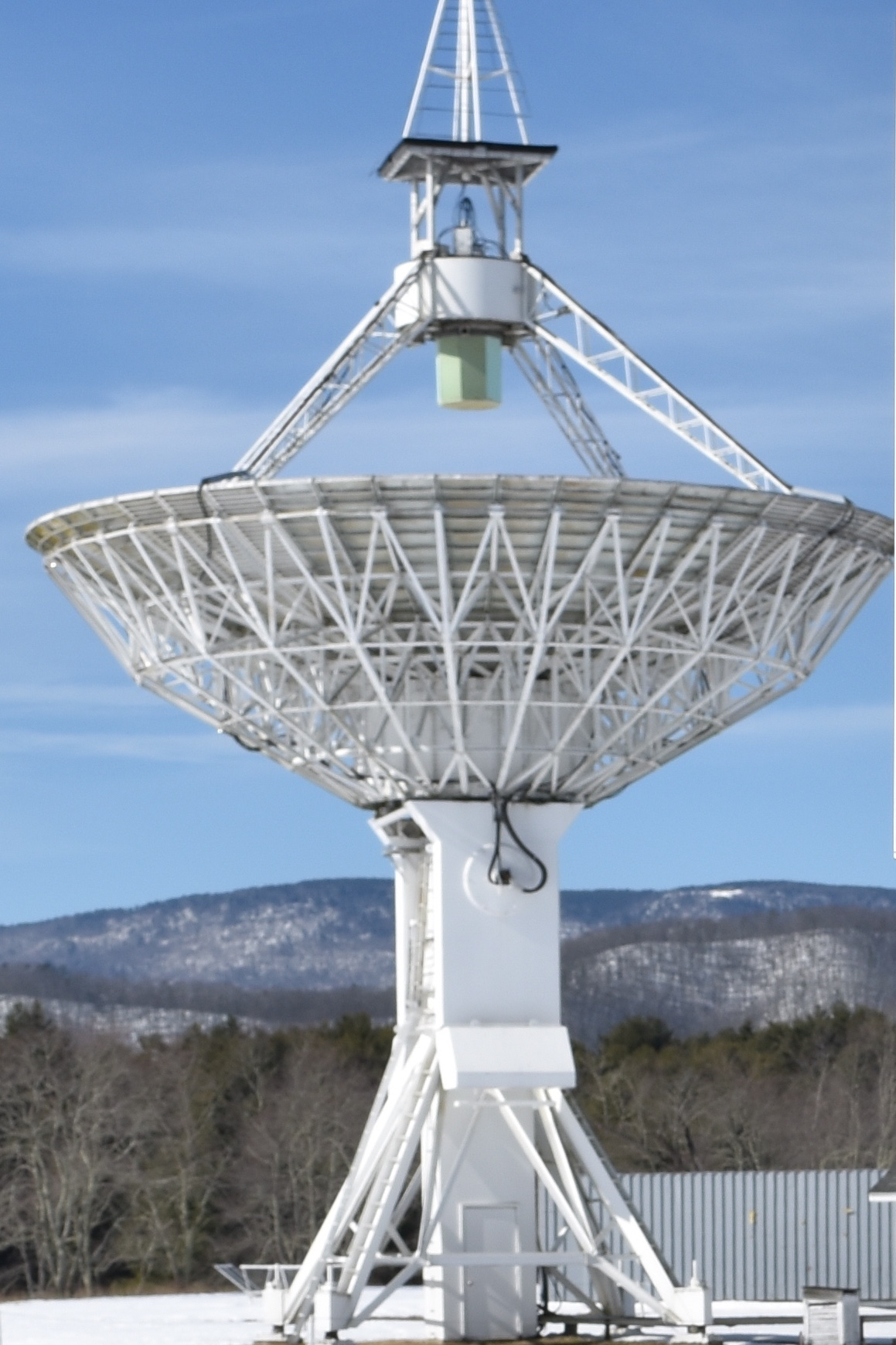
The 45-foot telescope after permanent installation at the Green Bank site

From 1978-1996, the GBI was operated in support of USNO and NRL geodetic and astronomy programs. In 1979, the GBI configuration had 85-3 and 85-2 at 0.9 miles (1.4 km) and 1.5 miles (2.4 km) away from 85-1 respectively, and the portable telescope at 22 miles (35 km) from Green Bank. In 1983, the 45-foot (14 m) portable telescope was moved back to Green Bank for another function to become a tracking station for Space VLBI satellites. The new 46-foot (14 m) portable telescope was put in place for interferometer operation until 1988 when the GBI reconfigured to 2-element interferometer with 85-3 taken out to become geodetic VLBI and pulsar monitoring telescope.

The GBI resumed operation as a radio monitoring instrument on Nov. 22, 1996, operated by NRAO and supported by the NASA High Energy Astrophysics program. The GBI was then used as a two telescope interferometer that operated simultaneously at 2.25 and 8.3 GHz to monitor transient, galactic X-ray binaries, AGN's and Gamma-ray sources. Amongst the prime sources were GRS 1915+105, GRO J1655-40, Cyg X-3, Cyg X-1, GRS 1716-249, SS 433, and LS I +61 303.

On October 6, 2000 the GBI monitoring program has ceased due to lack of funding.

== Technical Data: 2-element interferometer ==
- Baseline: 2400 meters at an azimuth of 62 degrees (E of N).
- Bands: 8.3 GHz (X-band) and 2.25 GHz (S-band) with 35 MHz bandwidth.
- Receivers: Cryogenically cooled, dual frequency, dual polarization. Both X and S bands simultaneously observed in both right and left circular polarizations.
- System temperature: About 35 K in Sband and 45 K in Xband.
- Sensitivity: RMS noise in a 5-minute scan is about 6 mJy in S-band and 10 mJy in X-band for point sources.
- Minimum integration time: 30 seconds.
- Resolution: About 3 arcseconds fringe at X-band and 11 arcseconds at S-band.

== See also ==
- List of radio telescopes
