= John D. Kraus =

American astrophysicist (1910–2004)

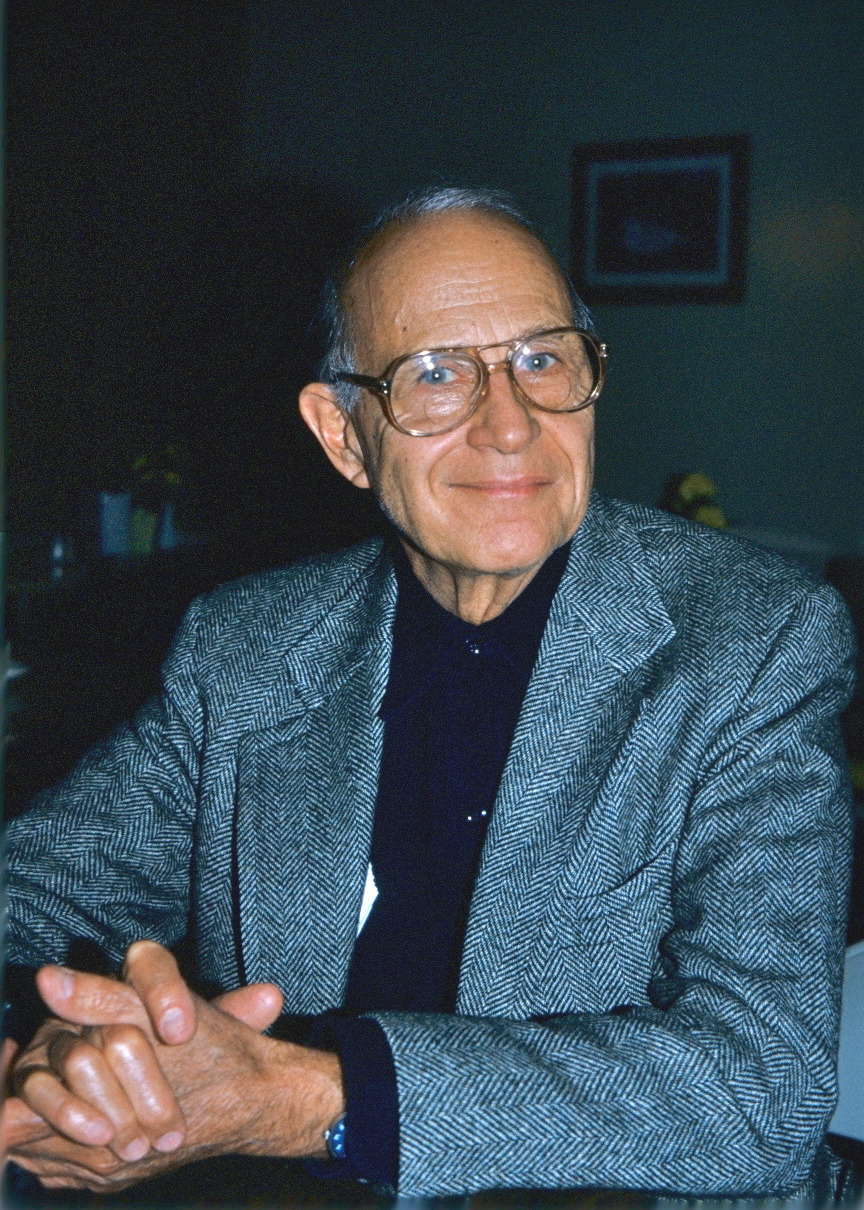
- Kraus in 1983
- Born: June 28, 1910; Ann Arbor, Michigan, U.S.
- Died: July 18, 2004 (aged 94); Liberty Township, Delaware County, Ohio, U.S.
- Education: University of Michigan
- Awards: IEEE Edison Medal (1985)
- Scientific career
- Fields: Physics
- Workplaces: Ohio State University; Harvard University; University of Michigan

John Daniel Kraus (June 28, 1910 – July 18, 2004) was an American physicist and electrical engineer known for his contributions to electromagnetics, radio astronomy, and antenna theory. His inventions included the helical antenna, the corner reflector antenna, and several other types of antennas. He designed the Big Ear radio telescope at Ohio State University, which was constructed mostly by a team of OSU students and was used to carry out the Ohio Sky Survey. Kraus held a number of patents and published widely.

== Personal ==
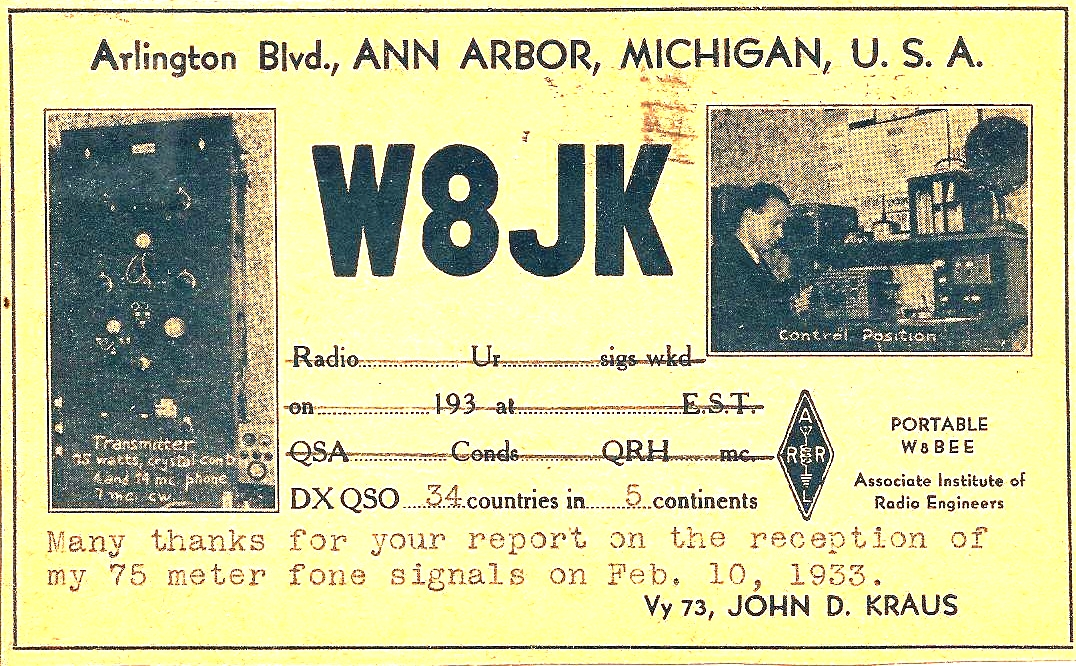
QSL card of John Kraus sent to shortwave listener, 1933

Kraus was born in 1910 in Ann Arbor, Michigan. He received his Ph.D. in physics from the University of Michigan in 1933. In addition to his professional achievements, he was an amateur radio operator, license w8jk, and made many technical contributions to amateur radio, particularly his development of the close-spaced directional array. His father was scientist Edward Henry Kraus.

Before World War II Kraus developed antennas including the corner reflector and w8jk close-spaced array. He also helped construct and operate the University of Michigan 100 ton cyclotron, then the world's most powerful particle accelerator.

== Career ==
Following the completion of his doctorate, Kraus was a member of the research team in nuclear physics at the University of Michigan, helping to design and build the school's new 100-ton cyclotron. During World War II he worked on degaussing ships for the United States Navy and on radar countermeasures at Harvard University.

After the war, Kraus joined Ohio State University, later becoming the director of the Radio Observatory and McDougal Professor (later Emeritus) of Electrical Engineering and Astronomy. He supervised the Ohio Sky Survey which cataloged over 19,000 radio sources, more than half previously unknown, and later participated in the SETI survey conducted by Bob Dixon.

=== Sputnik I ===
In 1958, while he was at Ohio State, Kraus used the signal of radio station WWV to track the disintegration of Russian satellite Sputnik 1. Kraus knew that a meteor entering the upper atmosphere leaves in its wake a small amount of ionized air. This air reflects a stray radio signal back to Earth, strengthening the signal at the surface for a few seconds. This effect is known as meteor scatter. Kraus predicted that what was left of Sputnik would exhibit the same effect, but on a larger scale. His prediction was correct; WWV's signal was noticeably strengthened for durations lasting over a minute. In addition, the strengthening came from a direction and at a time of day that agreed with predictions of the paths of Sputnik's last orbits. Using this information, Kraus was able to draw up a complete timeline of Sputnik's disintegration. His data also led him to conclude that satellites do not fail as one unit. Instead, his data indicated that the spacecraft broke up into its component parts as it moved closer to the Earth.

== Bibliography ==
- Antennas, 1950, 1st edition, published by McGraw-Hill was a textbook in which the helical antenna Kraus invented is described in detail. The book was referred to by many as the Antenna Bible. The second edition also single-handedly authored by Kraus was published in 1988 was a major upgrade of the work, incorporating the latest developments, though lacking some of the details of the first edition, to which the second frequently refers for mathematical deductions. For the third edition Ronald J. Marhefka joined Kraus as author and editor with many chapters written by experts in their field. The book was updated with respect to computer modeling and terahertz waves, and its title was changed to Antennas for all Applications:
- Antennas for all Applications, Kraus, Ronald J. Marhefka, McGraw-Hill 2002 (ISBN 007123201X).
- Big Ear 1976, Big Ear Two: Listening for Other-Worlds 1994.
- Electromagnetics, published by Mc-Graw Hill (ISBN 0071164294) 1953.
- Our Cosmic Universe 1980.
- Radio Astronomy, published by Cygnus-Quasar (ISBN 0070353921) 1966.

An updated second edition was released in 1986 in a spiral-bound form.

== Honors and awards ==
- U.S. Navy Meritorious Civilian Service Award, 1946.
- Elected to Fellow of the IEEE, 1954.
- Elected to member of the National Academy of Engineering, 1972.
- Joseph Sullivant Medal from the Ohio State University, 1970.
- Outstanding Achievement Award, the University of Michigan, 1981.
- IEEE Centennial Medal, 1984.
- IEEE Edison Medal, 1985.
- IEEE Heinrich Hertz Medal, 1990.
- Twice the Distinguished Achievement Award from the IEEE Antennas and Propagation Society, 1985 and 2003.

== See also ==
- Reber Radio Telescope
- Grote Reber
- Karl Guthe Jansky
- Astronomical radio source
- List of textbooks in electromagnetism
- Wow! signal
