= Edward Henry Kraus =

American mineralogist

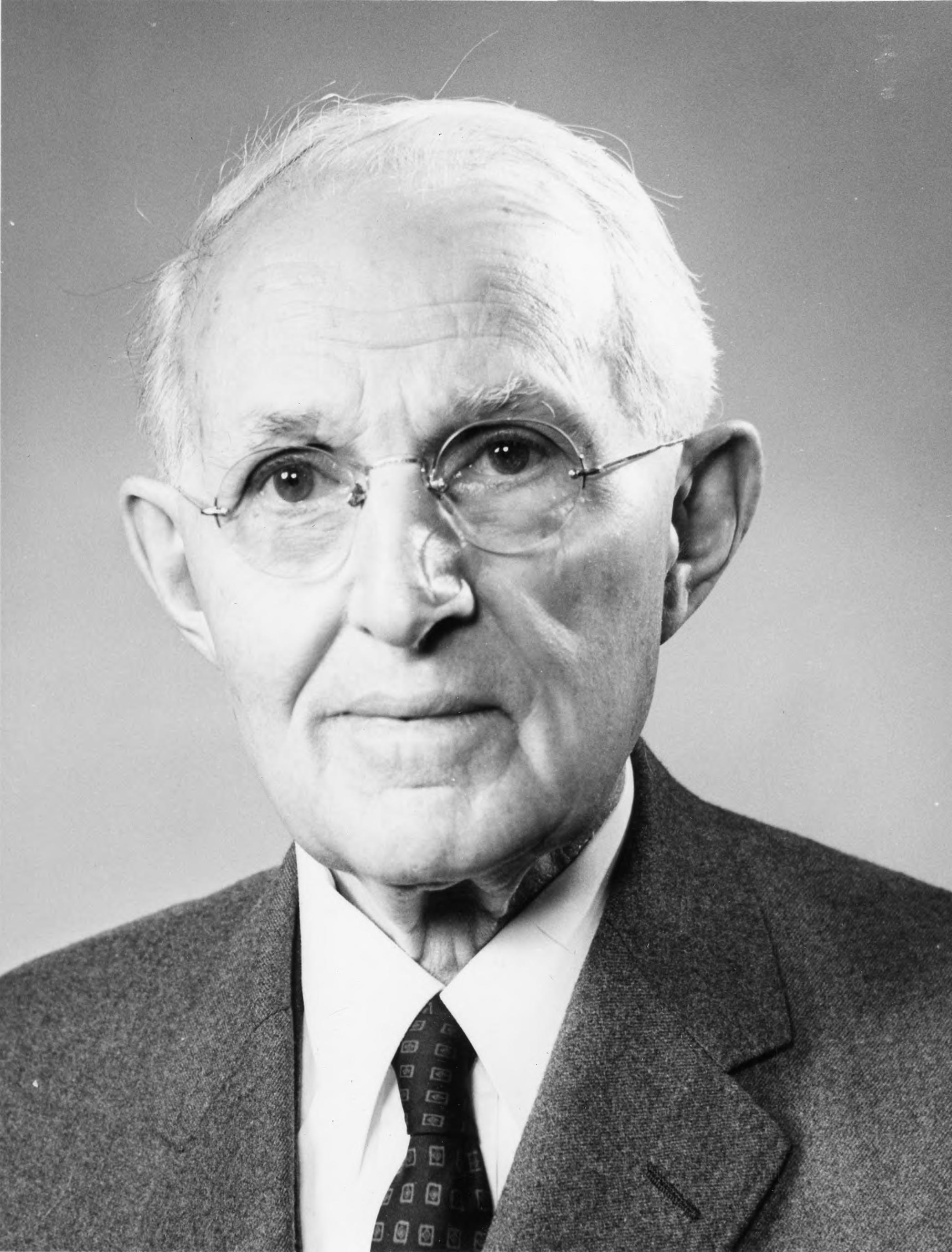
University of Michigan faculty portrait

Edward Henry Kraus (1 December 1875, Syracuse, NY, US – 1973) was a professor of mineralogy at the University of Michigan and also served as Dean of the Summer Session, 1915–1933, Dean of the College of Pharmacy, 1923–1933, and Dean of the College of Literature, Science and the Arts, 1933–1945.

== Biography ==
Edward Henry Kraus was born at Syracuse, New York, on December 1, 1875. His father was John Erhardt Kraus, of German ancestry, and his mother, Rosa Kocher Kraus, was of Swiss descent. After training in the high school of Syracuse, he entered Syracuse University, from which he was graduated as Bachelor of Science in 1896. During the following year he was a graduate student in that university and was also an assistant in chemistry and German. He received the degree of Master of Science at the end of the year. For two years, 1897–1899, he was instructor in German and mineralogy at Syracuse. From 1899 to 1901, he studied at the Ludwig-Maximilians-Universität München, and at the end of the period received the degree of Doctor of Philosophy magna cum laude. His major study was mineralogy with chemistry and geology as minors. His doctoral thesis was entitled "Ueber einige Salze der seltenen Erden" He returned to Syracuse University for one year, first as instructor in mineralogy and then as associate professor of the same subject. From 1902 until 1904, he was head of the department of science in the Syracuse High School and in the summer sessions of Syracuse University of 1903 and 1904 he was professor of chemistry and geology. Dr. Kraus was a fellow of the Geological Society of America, member of the American Chemical Society, the American Association for the Advancement of Science, and other scientific organizations. For two years, from 1903 until 1904, he was president of the Onondaga Academy of Science.

In the fall of 1904, he was called to the University of Michigan as assistant professor of mineralogy, and in 1906, he became Junior Professor. In 1907, he was made Junior Professor of Mineralogy and Petrography, and Director of the Mineralogical Laboratory, and in 1908 he was granted a full professorship in Mineralogy and Petrography. From 1908 to 1910, he was Secretary, and since 1911 Acting Dean of the Summer Session. From 1908 to 1912, he also served as Secretary of the Graduate School. He published Essentials of Crystallography in 1906, "Descriptive Mineralogy" and, with W. F. Hunt, "Tables for the Determination of Minerals", in 1911. On June 24, 1902, Dean Kraus was married to Lena Margaret Hoffman, and they had one daughter, Margaret Anna, and a son, John Daniel. A son, Edward Hoffman, died.

He was father of scientist John D. Kraus. He was a friend of Samuel Goudsmit, another professor at the University of Michigan.
