= Hexbeam =

Hexagonal antenna

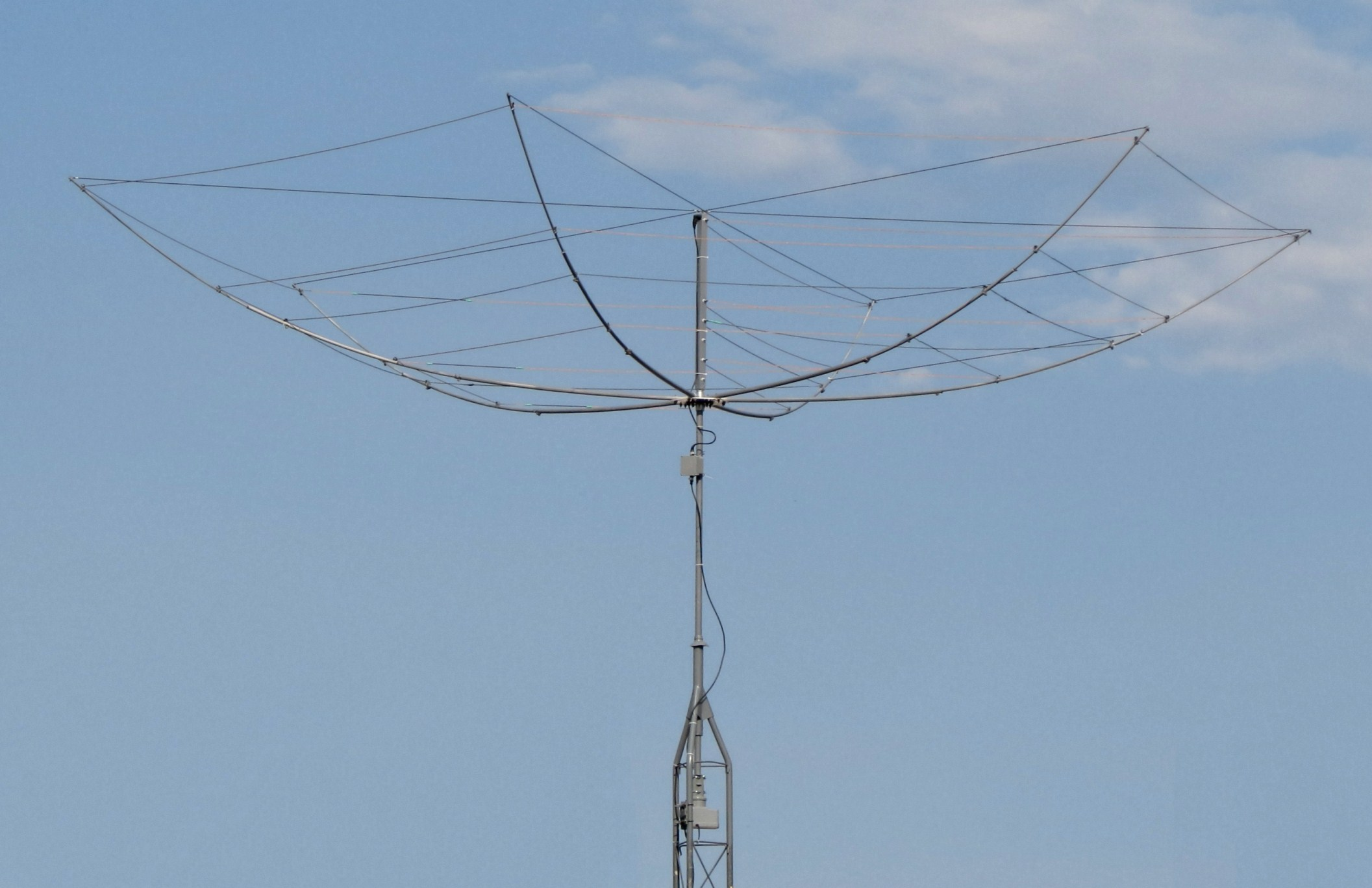
Hexbeam amateur radio antenna

A hexbeam, or hexagonal-beam, is a type of directional antenna for shortwave, most often used in amateur radio. The name comes from the hexagonal outer shape of the antenna. It may also sometimes be known as a W-antenna, referring to the shape of the driver. The design looks something like an upturned umbrella.

The antenna design resembles a modified Yagi–Uda antenna in that it uses parasitic principles from a driver and reflector for achieving gain in one direction. As with the Yagi-Uda antenna, when the RF wave strikes the reflector element it induces current in the reflector causing it to radiate in both directions. This reflector wave combines with the driven wave in the forward direction to produce gain, but subtracts or attenuates in the reverse direction. The Hexbeam uses a W-shaped or M-shaped dipole driver, and a U-shaped reflector. With six arms, it is possible to nest six bands.

As with the Moxon antenna, the design omits the directors found in a Yagi-Uda. Its antenna gain is between 5dBi and 6dBi, the forward/reverse attenuation is up to 20 dB.

The hexbeam consists of six arms of non-conductive materials such as fiberglass or plastic pipes, and insulated metallic wire is used to form the elements. In the original design, there were two W-shaped elements. This antenna was first introduced by Mike Traffie, N1HXA, in 1996. Steve Hunt, G3TXQ, did an exploration of this design because of conflicting accounts from users and home builders regarding antenna gain, bandwidth, and forward/reverse gain. Hunt published his improvements in December 2007 in the online magazine AntennaX, in an article titled Broadband Hexbeam. In his modified design, Hunt changed the dimensions and shape of the antenna elements, resulting in an antenna which retained the W-shaped driver, but with a reflector that has more of a semicircular shape.

Radio amateurs can build the Hexbeam as a multi-band antenna to cover different frequency ranges. Popular combinations cover 20m, 15m and 10m (3 band) and 20m, 17m, 15m, 12m and 10m (5-band) ham radio bands. Hexbeams can also be built for the 40m and 30m bands. The antenna elements for the lowest frequency band are located at the exterior of the antenna. When constructing multi-band hexbeams, the vertical spacing of each element is critical, because the elements of a multi-band hexbeam mutually influence each other and if the elements are not parallel, parameters of the antenna may change undesirably.
