= Karl Guthe Jansky =

American physicist and radio engineer (1905–1950)

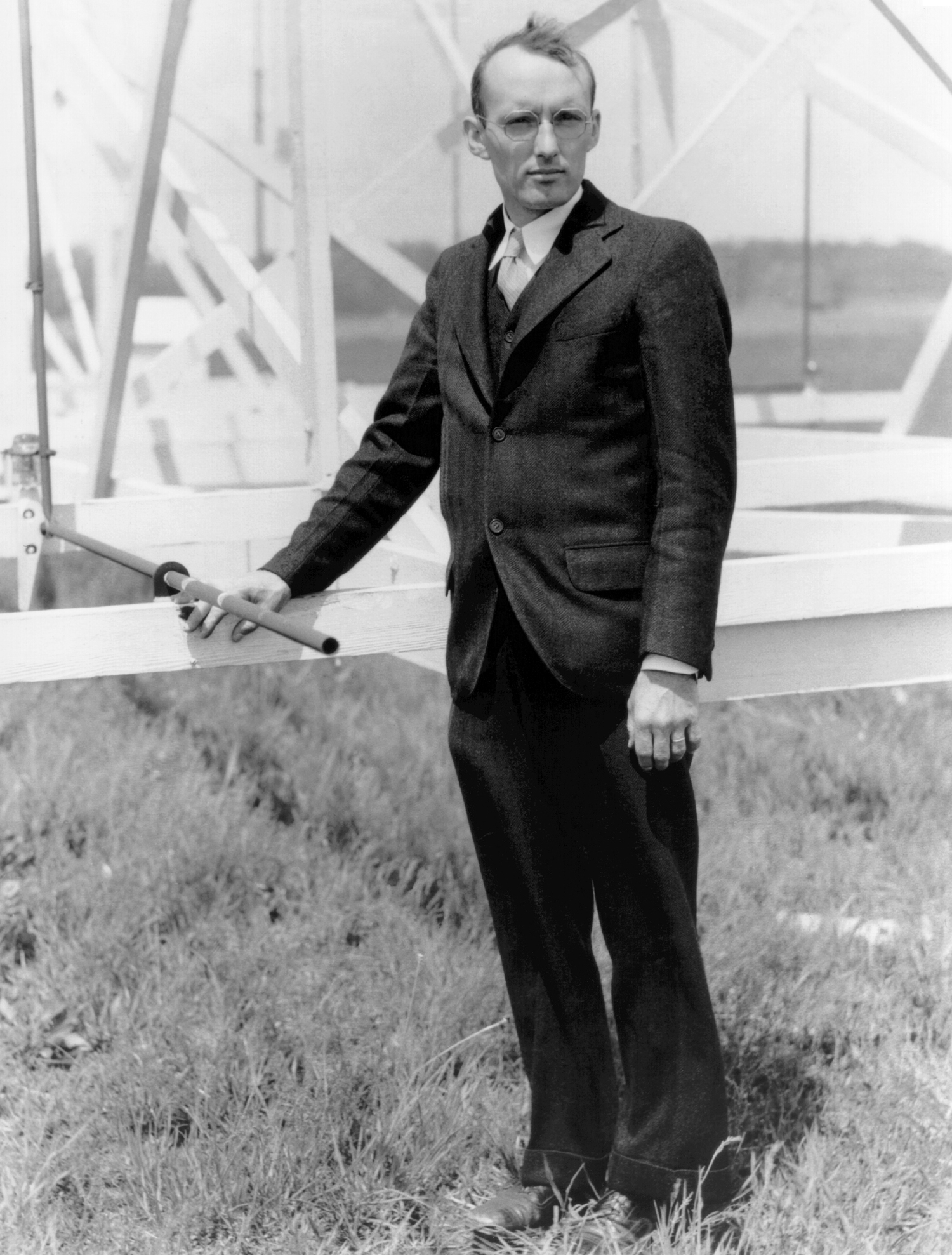
- Born: October 22, 1905; Norman, Oklahoma, U.S.
- Died: February 14, 1950 (aged 44); Red Bank, New Jersey, U.S.
- Education: University of Wisconsin (BS)
- Known for: Radio astronomy
- Scientific career
- Fields: Physics; Radio astronomy
- Workplaces: Bell Labs

Karl Guthe Jansky (October 22, 1905 – February 14, 1950) was an American physicist and radio engineer who in April 1933 first announced his discovery of radio waves emanating from the Milky Way in the constellation Sagittarius. An amateur astronomer, he is considered one of the founding figures of radio astronomy.

== Early life ==
Karl Guthe Jansky was born 1905 in what was then the Territory of Oklahoma where his father, Cyril M. Jansky, was dean of the college of engineering at the University of Oklahoma at Norman. Cyril M. Jansky, born in Wisconsin of Czech immigrants, had started teaching at the age of sixteen. He was a teacher throughout his active life, retiring as professor of electrical engineering at the University of Wisconsin. He was an engineer with a strong interest in physics, a trait passed on to his sons. Karl Jansky was named after Dr. Karl Eugen Guthe, a professor of physics at the University of Michigan who had been an important mentor to Cyril M. Jansky.

Karl Jansky's mother, born Nellie Moreau, was of French and English descent. Karl's brother Cyril Jansky Jr., who was ten years older, helped build some of the earliest radio transmitters in the country, including 9XM in Wisconsin (now WHA of Wisconsin Public Radio) and 9XI in Minnesota (now KUOM).

Karl Jansky attended college at the University of Wisconsin, where he received his BS in physics in 1927. He stayed an extra year at Madison, completing all the graduate course work for a master's degree in physics except for the thesis. In July 1928 at age 22, he was able to join the Bell Telephone Laboratories, and because of a kidney condition he had since college (which eventually led to his early death), he was sent to the healthier environs of the field station in Holmdel, New Jersey. Bell Labs wanted to investigate atmospheric and ionospheric properties using "short waves" (wavelengths of about 10–20 meters) for use in trans-Atlantic radio telephone service. As a radio engineer, Jansky was assigned the job of investigating sources of static that might interfere with radio voice transmissions.

== Radio astronomy ==
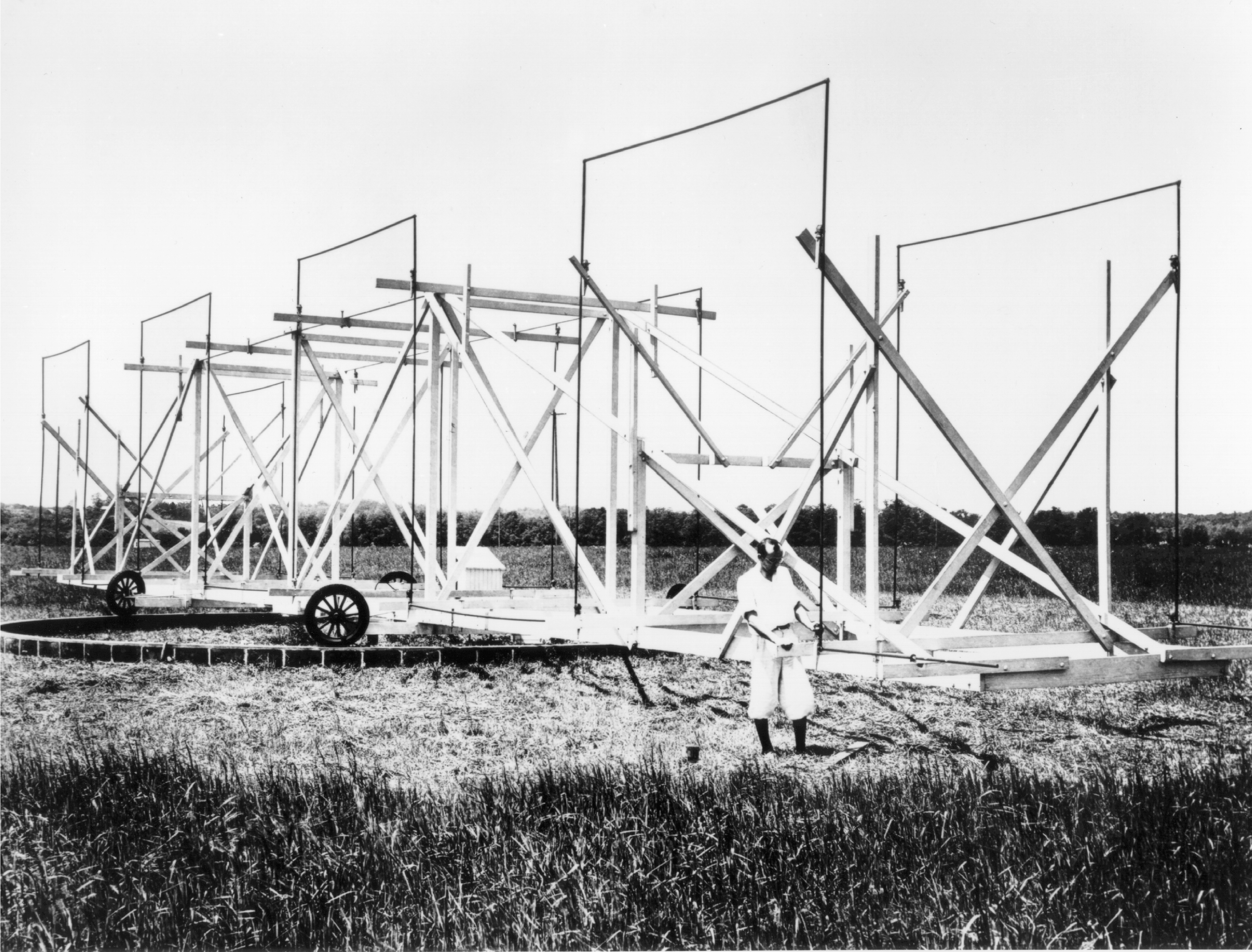
Jansky and his rotating directional radio antenna (early 1930s), the world's first radio telescope.

At Bell Telephone Laboratories, Jansky built a directional antenna designed to receive radio waves at a frequency of 20.5 MHz (wavelength about 14.6 meters). It had a diameter of approximately 100 ft. (30 meters) and stood 20 ft. (6 meters) tall. It was mounted on top of a turntable on a set of four Ford Model-T wheels, which allowed it to be rotated in the azimuthal direction, earning it the nickname "Jansky's merry-go-round" (the cost of which was later estimated to be less than $1000). By rotating the antenna, the azimuthal direction of a received signal could be pinpointed. The intensity of the signal was recorded by an analog pen-and-paper recording system housed in a small shed to the side of the antenna.

After recording signals from all directions for several months, Jansky eventually categorized them into three types of static: nearby thunderstorms, distant thunderstorms, and a faint static or "hiss" of unknown origin. He spent over a year investigating the source of the third type of static. The location of maximum intensity rose and fell once a day, leading Jansky to surmise initially that he was detecting radiation from the Sun.

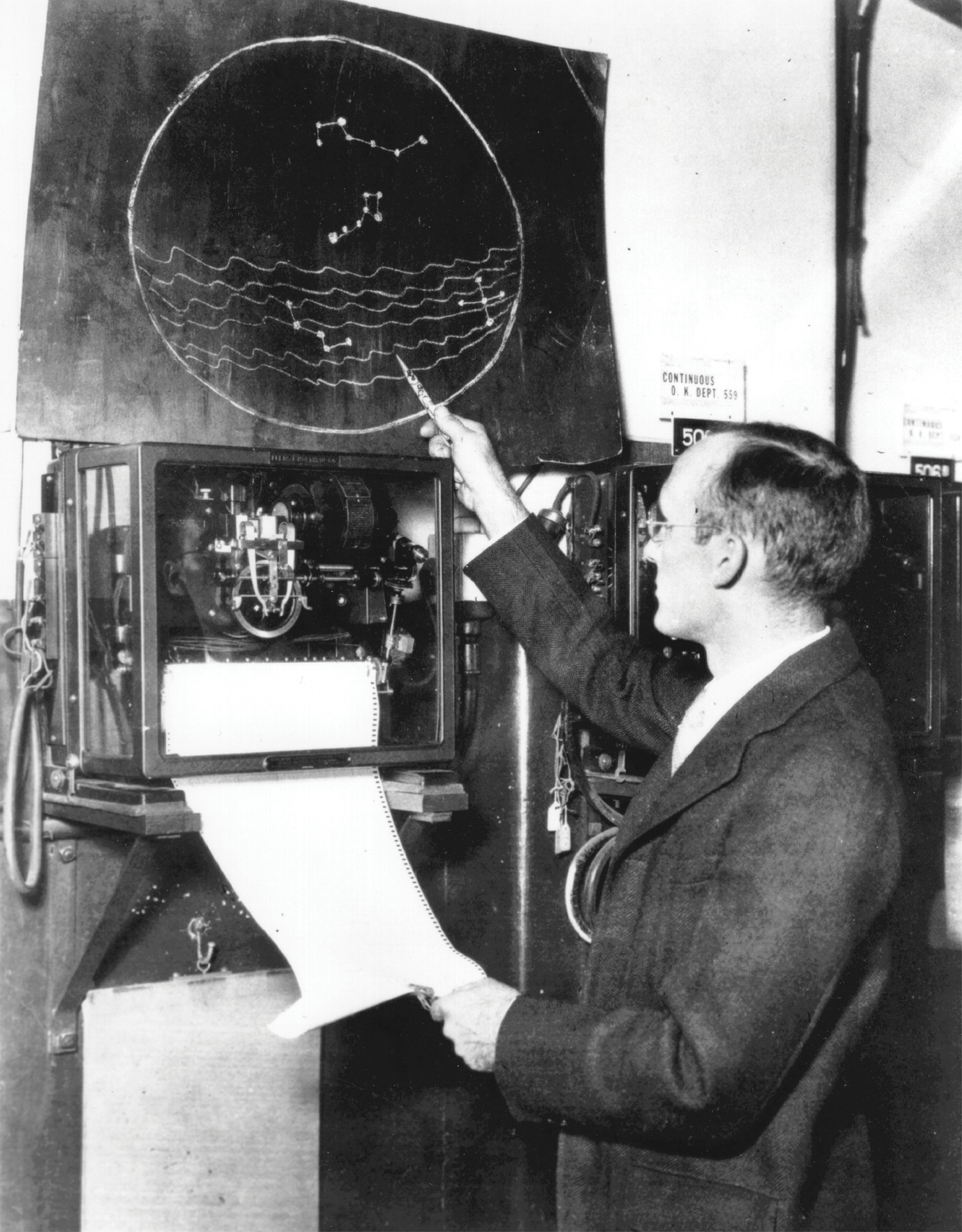
Jansky with a rough map of the night sky and pointing to the constellation of Cassiopeia. The wavy lines track the radio emissions he discovered on the chart paper, which also line up with the disk of the Milky Way.

After a few months of following the signal, however, the point of maximum static moved away from the position of the Sun. Jansky also determined that the signal repeated on a cycle of 23 hours and 56 minutes. Jansky discussed the puzzling phenomena with his friend the astrophysicist Albert Melvin Skellett, who pointed out that the observed time between the signal peaks was the exact length of a sidereal day; the time it took for "fixed" astronomical objects, such as a star, to pass in front of the antenna every time the Earth rotated. By comparing his observations with optical astronomical maps, Jansky concluded that the radiation was coming from the Milky Way and was strongest (7:10 p.m. on September 16, 1932) in the direction of the center of the galaxy, in the constellation of Sagittarius.

Jansky announced his discovery at a meeting in Washington D.C. in April 1933 to a small audience who could not comprehend its significance. His discovery was widely publicized, appearing in the New York Times of May 5, 1933, and he was interviewed on a special NBC program on "Radio sounds from among the stars". In October 1933, his discovery was published in a journal article entitled "Electrical disturbances apparently of extraterrestrial origin" in the Proceedings of the Institute of Radio Engineers.

If the radio sources were from the stars, the Sun should also be producing radio noise, but Jansky found that it did not. In the early 1930s, the Sun was at an inactive phase in its sunspot cycle. In 1935 Jansky made the suggestion that the strange radio signals were produced from interstellar gas, in particular, by "thermal agitation of charged particles." Jansky accomplished these investigations while still in his twenties with a bachelor's degree in physics.

Jansky wanted to further investigate the Milky Way radio waves after 1935 (he called the radiation "Star Noise" in the thesis he submitted to earn his 1936 University of Wisconsin Masters degree), but he found little support from either astronomers, for whom it was completely foreign, or Bell Labs, which could not justify, during the Great Depression, the cost of research on a phenomenon that did not significantly affect trans-Atlantic communications systems.

== Follow-up ==
Several scientists were interested in Jansky's discovery, but radio astronomy remained a dormant field for several years, due in part to Jansky's lack of formal training as an astronomer. His discovery had come in the midst of the Great Depression, and observatories were wary of taking on any new and potentially risky projects.

Two men who learned of Jansky's 1933 discovery were of great influence on the later development of the new study of radio astronomy: one was Grote Reber, a radio engineer who singlehandedly built a radio telescope in his Illinois back yard in 1937 and did the first systematic survey of astronomical radio waves. The second was John D. Kraus, who, after World War II, started a radio observatory at Ohio State University and wrote a textbook on radio astronomy, long considered a standard by radio astronomers.

In 1930 essentially all that we knew about the heavens had come from what we could see or photograph. Karl Jansky changed all that. A universe of radio sounds to which mankind had been deaf since time immemorial now suddenly burst forth in full chorus.
–John D. Kraus

== Death and legacy ==
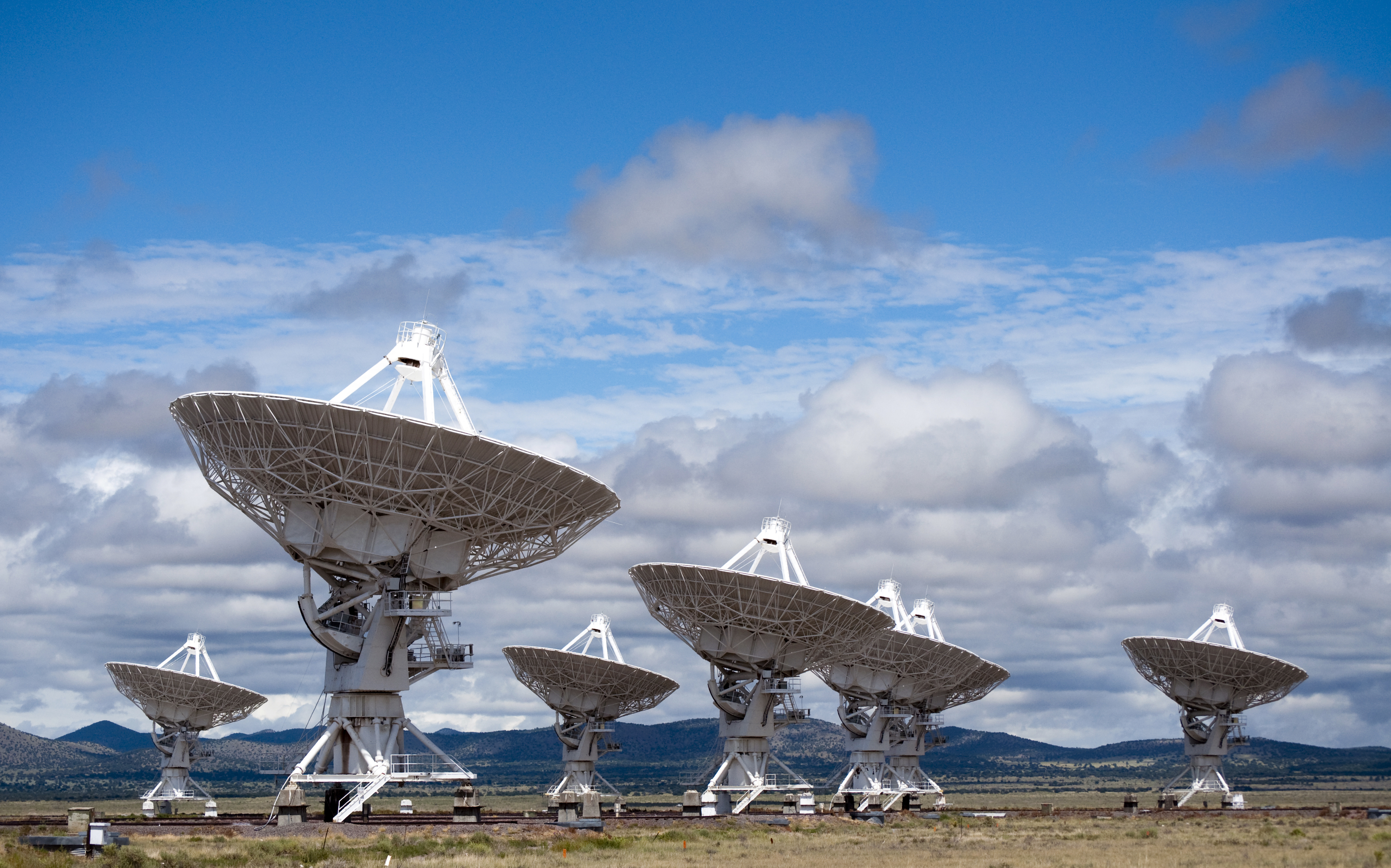
Karl G. Jansky Very Large Array, National Radio Astronomy Observatory, New Mexico

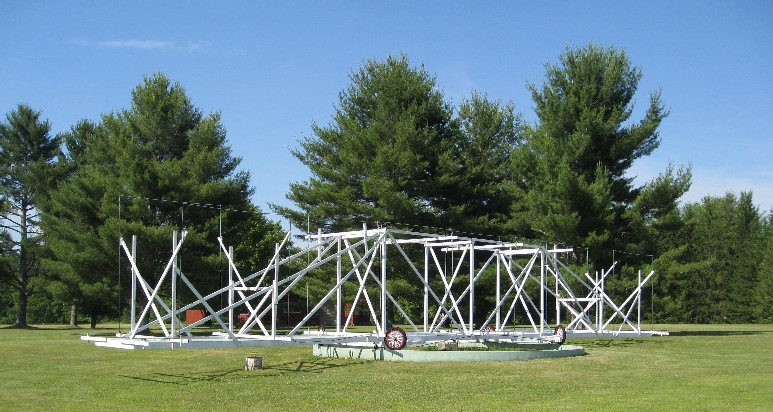
Full-size replica of Jansky's radio telescope, now at the Green Bank Observatory

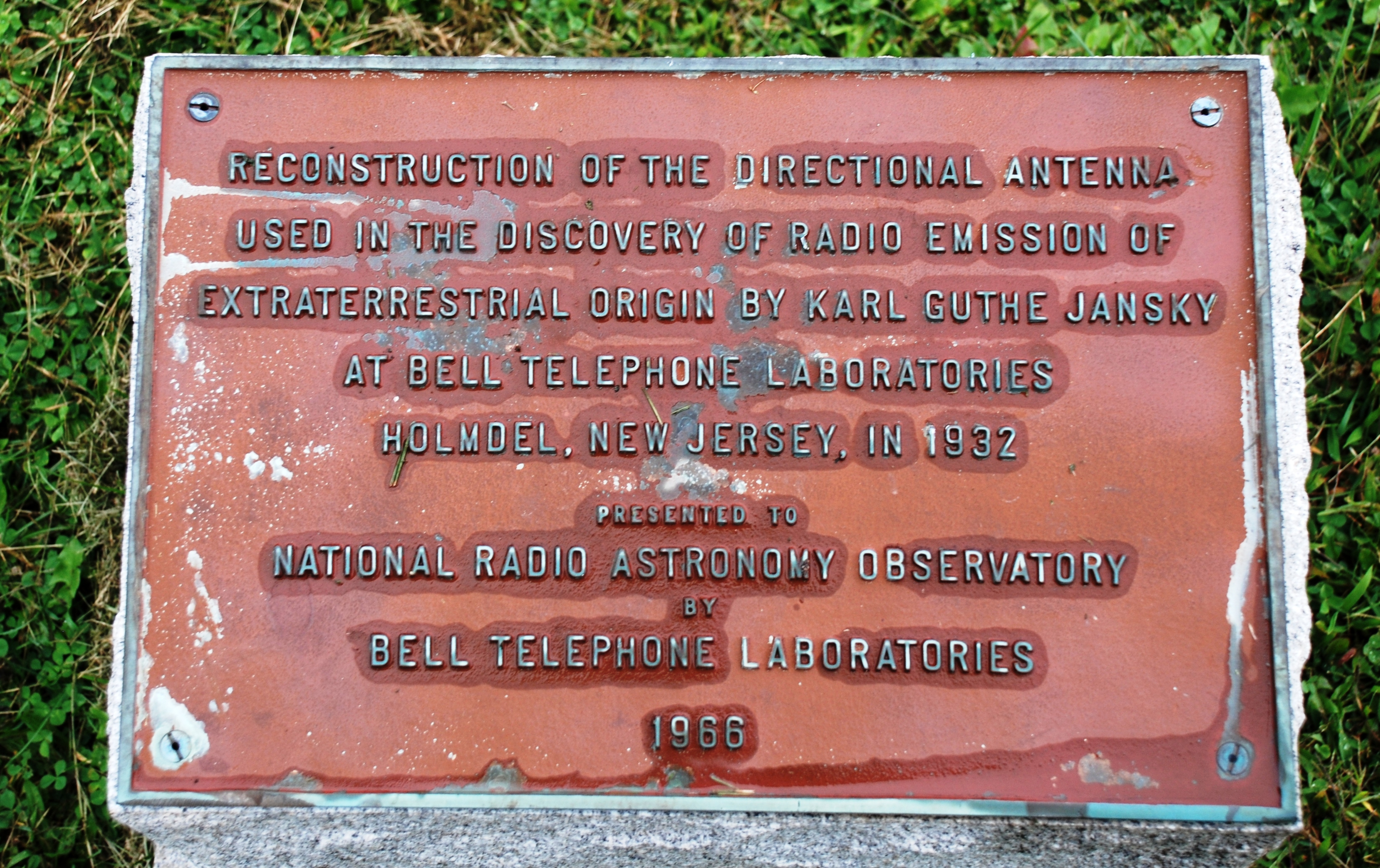
Green Bank plaque: Jansky Antenna

Jansky was a resident of Little Silver, New Jersey, and died at age 44 in a Red Bank, New Jersey, hospital (now called Riverview Medical Center) due to a heart condition.

Had Jansky not died at a very early age, he would undoubtedly have been awarded the Nobel Prize. His serendipitous discovery gave birth to a new branch of astronomy, radio astronomy.
–William A. Imbriale

In honor of Jansky, the unit used by radio astronomers for the spectral irradiance of radio sources is the jansky (1 Jy = 10^{−26} W⋅m^{−2}⋅Hz^{−1}). The crater Jansky on the Moon is also named after him, as is the Asteroid 1932 Jansky. The National Radio Astronomy Observatory (NRAO) postdoctoral fellowship program is named after Karl Jansky. NRAO awards the Jansky Prize annually in Jansky's honor. On March 31, 2012, the NRAO renamed the Very Large Array (VLA) radio telescope in Magdalena, New Mexico, as the Karl G. Jansky Very Large Array in honor of Jansky's contribution to radio astronomy.

A full-scale replica of Jansky's original rotating telescope is located on the grounds of the Green Bank Observatory (38°25′53.9″N 79°48′58.5″W, formerly an NRAO site) in Green Bank, West Virginia, near a reconstructed version of Grote Reber's 9-meter dish.

In 1998, the original site of Jansky's antenna (40°21′54.5″N 74°09′48.9″W) at what is now the Bell Labs Holmdel Complex at 101 Crawfords Corner Road, Holmdel, New Jersey, was determined by Tony Tyson and Robert Wilson of Lucent Technologies (the successor of Bell Telephone Laboratories) and a monument and a plaque were placed there to honor the achievement. The monument is a stylized sculpture of the antenna and is oriented as Jansky's antenna was at 7:10 p.m. on September 16, 1932, at a moment of maximum signal caused by alignment with the center of our galaxy in the direction of the constellation Sagittarius.

Jansky noise is named after Jansky, and refers to high frequency static disturbances of cosmic origin, cosmic noise.

== Selected writings ==
- Jansky, Karl Guthe (December 1932). "Directional studies of atmospherics at high frequencies". Proc. IRE. 20 (12): 1920. doi:10.1109/JRPROC.1932.227477. S2CID 51660959.
- Jansky, Karl Guthe (July 8, 1933). "Radio waves from outside the solar system". Nature. 132 (3323): 66. Bibcode:1933Natur.132...66J. doi:10.1038/132066a0. S2CID 4063838.
- Jansky, Karl Guthe (October 1933). "Electrical disturbances apparently of extraterrestrial origin". Proc. IRE. 21 (10): 1387. doi:10.1109/JRPROC.1933.227458. Reprinted 65 years later as Jansky, Karl Guthe (July 1998). "Electrical disturbances apparently of extraterrestrial origin". Proc. IEEE. 86 (7): 1510–1515. doi:10.1109/JPROC.1998.681378. S2CID 47549559. along with an explanatory preface in Imbriale, W.A. (1998). "Introduction to "Electrical Disturbances Apparently of Extraterrestrial Origin"". Proc. IEEE. 86 (7): 1507–1509. doi:10.1109/JPROC.1998.681377..
- Jansky, Karl Guthe (December 1933). "Electrical phenomena that apparently are of interstellar origin". Popular Astronomy. 41: 548. Bibcode:1933PA.....41..548J.
- Jansky, Karl Guthe (October 1935). "A note on the source of interstellar interference". Proc. IRE. 23 (10): 1158. doi:10.1109/JRPROC.1935.227275. S2CID 51632813.
- Jansky, Karl Guthe (December 1937). "Minimum noise levels obtained on short-wave radio receiving systems". Proc. IRE. 25 (12): 1517. doi:10.1109/JRPROC.1937.228780. S2CID 51660095.

== See also ==
- Reber Radio Telescope
- Astronomical radio source
- Radio Astronomy
