= Grote Reber =

American astronomer

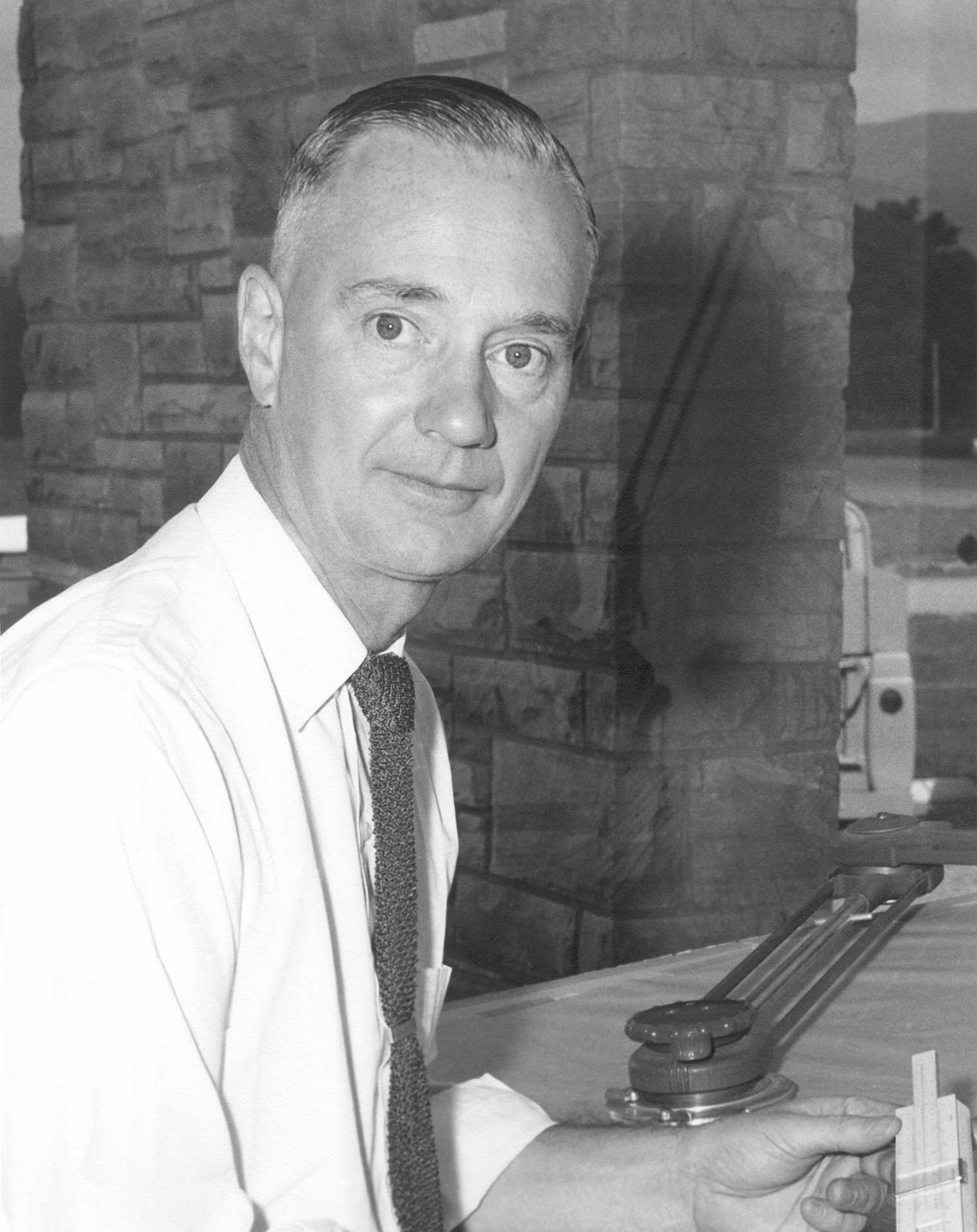
- Reber in 1975
- Born: December 22, 1911; Wheaton, Illinois, United States
- Died: December 20, 2002 (aged 90); Ouse, Tasmania
- Education: Illinois Institute of Technology
- Known for: Pioneering work in radio astronomy
- Awards: Elliott Cresson Medal (1963)
- Scientific career
- Fields: Radio astronomy

Grote Reber (December 22, 1911 – December 20, 2002) was an American pioneer of radio astronomy, which combined his interests in amateur radio and amateur astronomy. He was instrumental in investigating and extending Karl Jansky's pioneering work and conducted the first sky survey in the radio frequencies.

His 1937 radio antenna was the second ever to be used for astronomical purposes and the first parabolic reflecting antenna to be used as a radio telescope. For nearly a decade he was the world's only radio astronomer.

== Life ==
Reber was born and raised in Wheaton, Illinois, a suburb of Chicago, and graduated from Armour Institute of Technology (now Illinois Institute of Technology) in 1933 with a degree in electrical engineering. He was an amateur radio operator (callsign W9GFZ), and worked for various radio manufacturers in Chicago from 1933 to 1947.

When he learned of Karl Jansky's work in 1933, he decided this was the field he wanted to work in, and applied to Bell Labs, where Jansky was working.

=== Pioneer of Radio astronomy ===
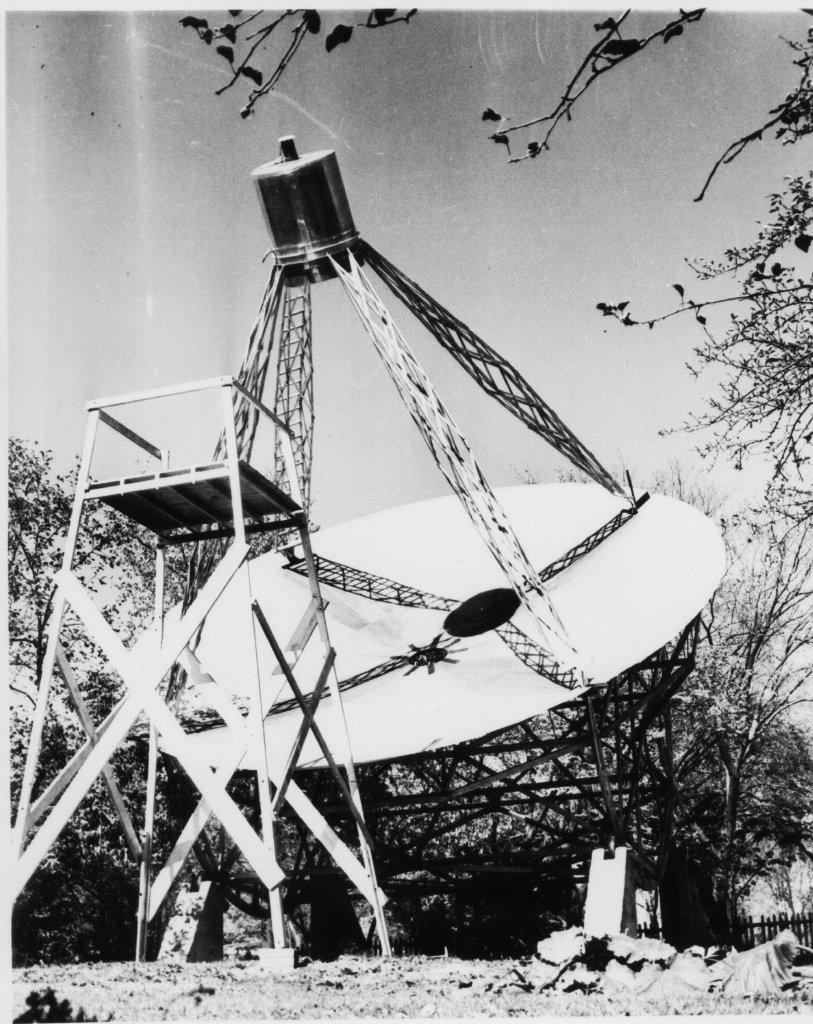
Reber Radio Telescope in Wheaton, Illinois, 1937

In the summer of 1937, Reber decided to build his own radio telescope in his back yard in Wheaton, Illinois. Reber's radio telescope was considerably more advanced than Jansky's, and consisted of a parabolic sheet metal dish 9 meters in diameter, focusing to a radio receiver 8 meters above the dish. The entire assembly was mounted on a tilting stand, allowing it to be pointed in various directions, though not turned. The telescope was completed in September 1937.

Reber's first receiver operated at 3300 MHz and failed to detect signals from outer space, as did his second, operating at 900 MHz. Finally, his third attempt, at 160 MHz, was successful in 1938, confirming Jansky's discovery. In 1940, he achieved his first professional publication, in the Astrophysical Journal, but Reber refused a research appointment with Yerkes Observatory. He turned his attention to making a radiofrequency sky map, which he completed in 1941 and extended in 1943. He published a considerable body of work during this era, and was the initiator of the "explosion" of radio astronomy in the immediate post-Second World War era. His data, published as contour maps showing the brightness of the sky in radio wavelengths, revealed the existence of radio sources such as Cygnus A and Cassiopeia A for the first time. For nearly a decade from 1937 on he was the world's only radio astronomer, a field that only expanded after World War Two when scientists, who had gained a great deal of knowledge during the wartime expansion of RADAR, entered the field, starting with Project Diana.

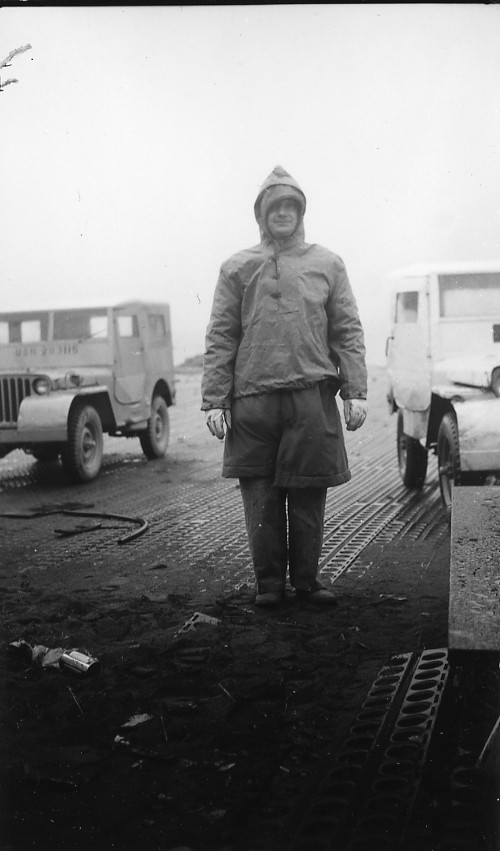
Grote Reber during the Naval Research Laboratories solar eclipse expedition to Attu, Alaska, August-September 1950.

During this time he uncovered a mystery that was not explained until the 1950s. The standard theory of radio emissions from space was that they were due to black-body radiation, light (of which radio is a non-visible form) that is given off by all hot bodies. Using this theory one would expect that there would be considerably more high-energy light than low-energy, due to the presence of stars and other hot bodies. However Reber demonstrated that the reverse was true, and that there was a considerable amount of low-energy radio signal. It was not until the 1950s that synchrotron radiation was offered as an explanation for these measurements.

Reber sold his telescope to the National Bureau of Standards, and it was erected on a turntable at their field station in Sterling, Virginia. Eventually the telescope made its way to the National Radio Astronomy Observatory in Green Bank, West Virginia, and Reber supervised its reconstruction at that site. Reber also helped with a reconstruction of Jansky's original telescope.

=== Medium frequency research ===
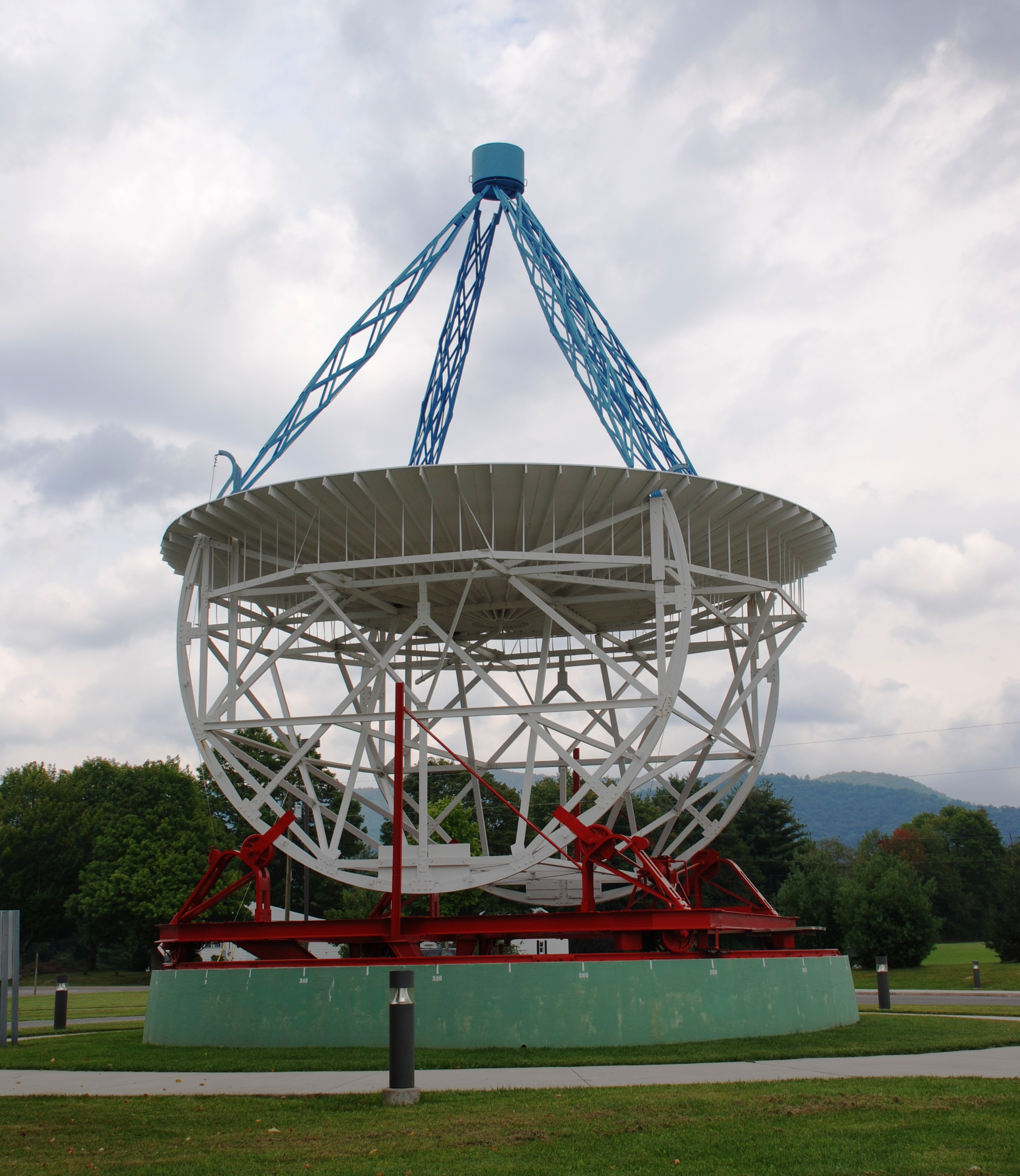
Reconstructed Reber Radio Telescope at National Radio Astronomy Observatory in Green Bank, West Virginia

Starting in 1951, he received generous support from the Research Corporation in New York, and moved to Hawaii. In the 1950s, he wanted to return to active studies but much of the field was already filled with very large and expensive instruments. Instead he turned to a field that was being largely ignored, that of medium frequency (hectometre) radio signals in the 0.5–3 MHz range, around the AM broadcast bands. However, signals with frequencies below 30 MHz are reflected by an ionized layer in the Earth's atmosphere called the ionosphere. In 1954, Reber moved to Tasmania, the southernmost state of Australia, where he worked with Bill Ellis at the University of Tasmania. There, on very cold, long, winter nights the ionosphere would, after many hours shielded from the Sun's radiation by the bulk of the Earth, 'quieten' and de-ionize, allowing the longer radio waves into his antenna array. Reber described this as being a "fortuitous situation". Tasmania also offered low levels of man-made radio noise, which permitted reception of the faint signals from outer space.

In the 1960s, he had an array of dipoles set up on the sheep grazing property of Dennistoun, about 7.5 km (5 miles) northeast of the town of Bothwell, Tasmania, where he lived in a house of his own design and construction he decided to build after he purchased a job lot of coach bolts at a local auction. He imported 4x8 douglas fir beams directly from a sawmill in Oregon, and then high technology double glazed window panes, also from the US. The bolts held the house together. The window panes formed a north facing passive solar wall, heating mat black painted, dimpled copper sheets, from which the warmed air rose by convection. The interior walls were lined with reflective rippled aluminium foil. The house was so well thermally insulated that the oven in the kitchen was nearly unusable because the heat from it, unable to escape, would raise the temperature of the room to over 50 °C (120 °F).

=== Final years ===
His house was never completely finished. It was meant to have a passive heat storage device, in the form of a thermally insulated pit full of dolerite rocks, underneath, but although his mind was sharp, his body started to fail him in his later years, and he was never able to move the rocks. He was fascinated by mirrors and had at least one in every room. He had one of the amplifiers from the prime focus of his first telescope, probably the one used at 900 MHz. It was of compact point-to-point construction and used two R.C.A. type 955 "acorn" thermionic valves. All the rubber-insulated wires in it had perished and the rubber was hard and crumbly. He powered this amplifier, and all his later receivers at Dennistoun, from batteries, to avoid interference entering the equipment along power cables.

His memorial plaque at the Mullard Radio Astronomy Observatory

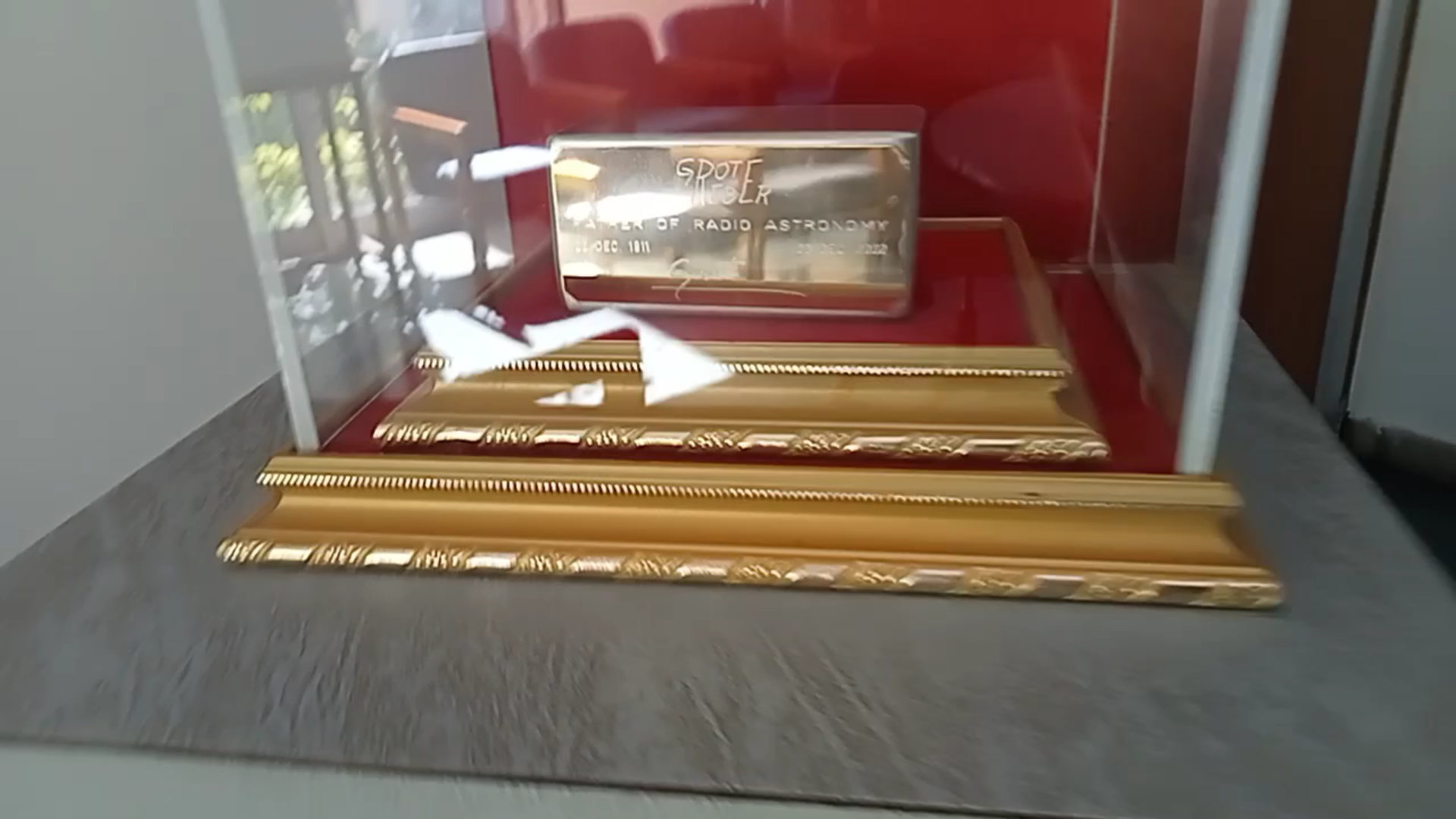
Grote Reber's ashes at the Giant Metrewave Radio Telescope

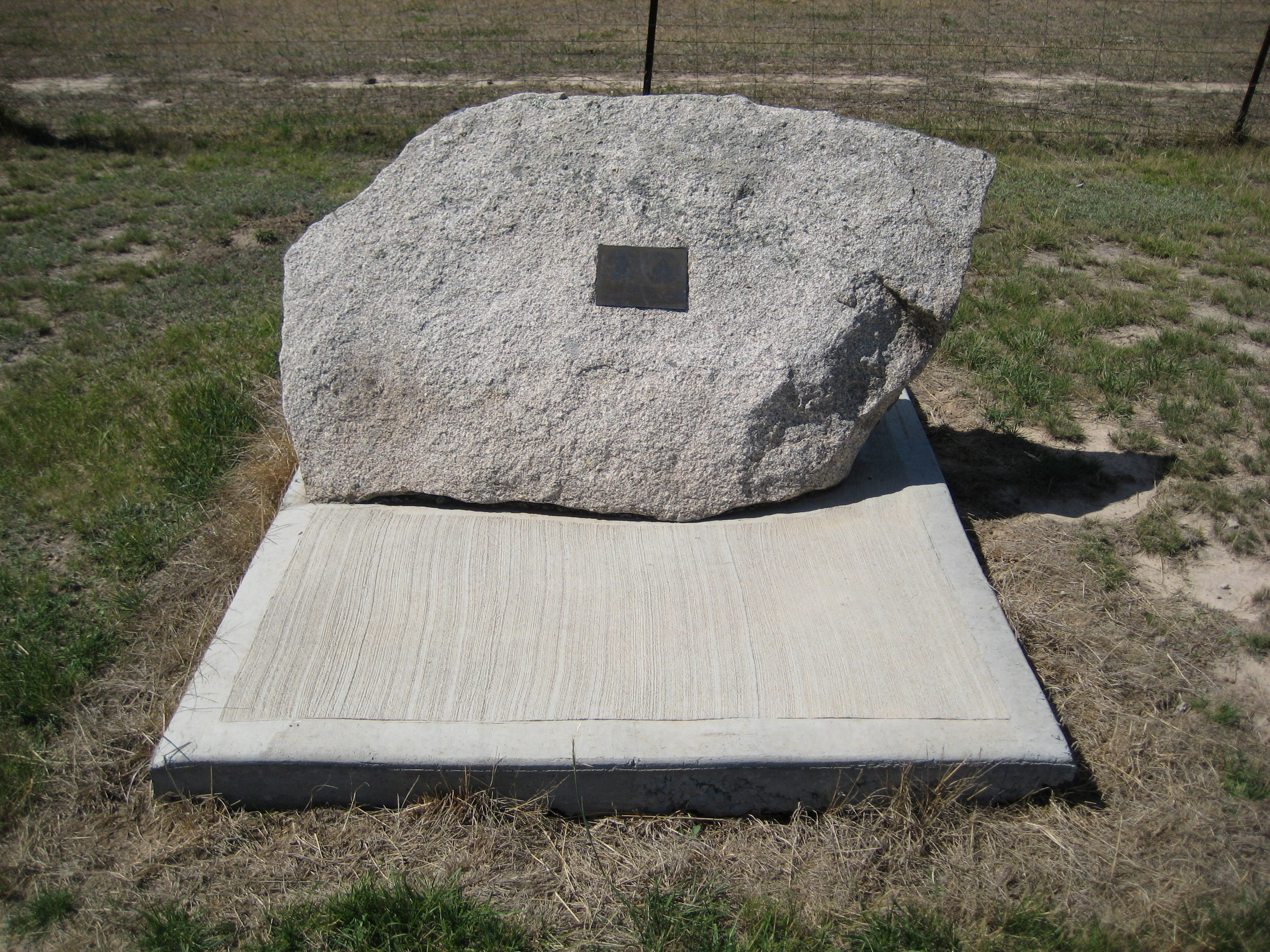
Memorial at Molonglo Observatory Synthesis Telescope

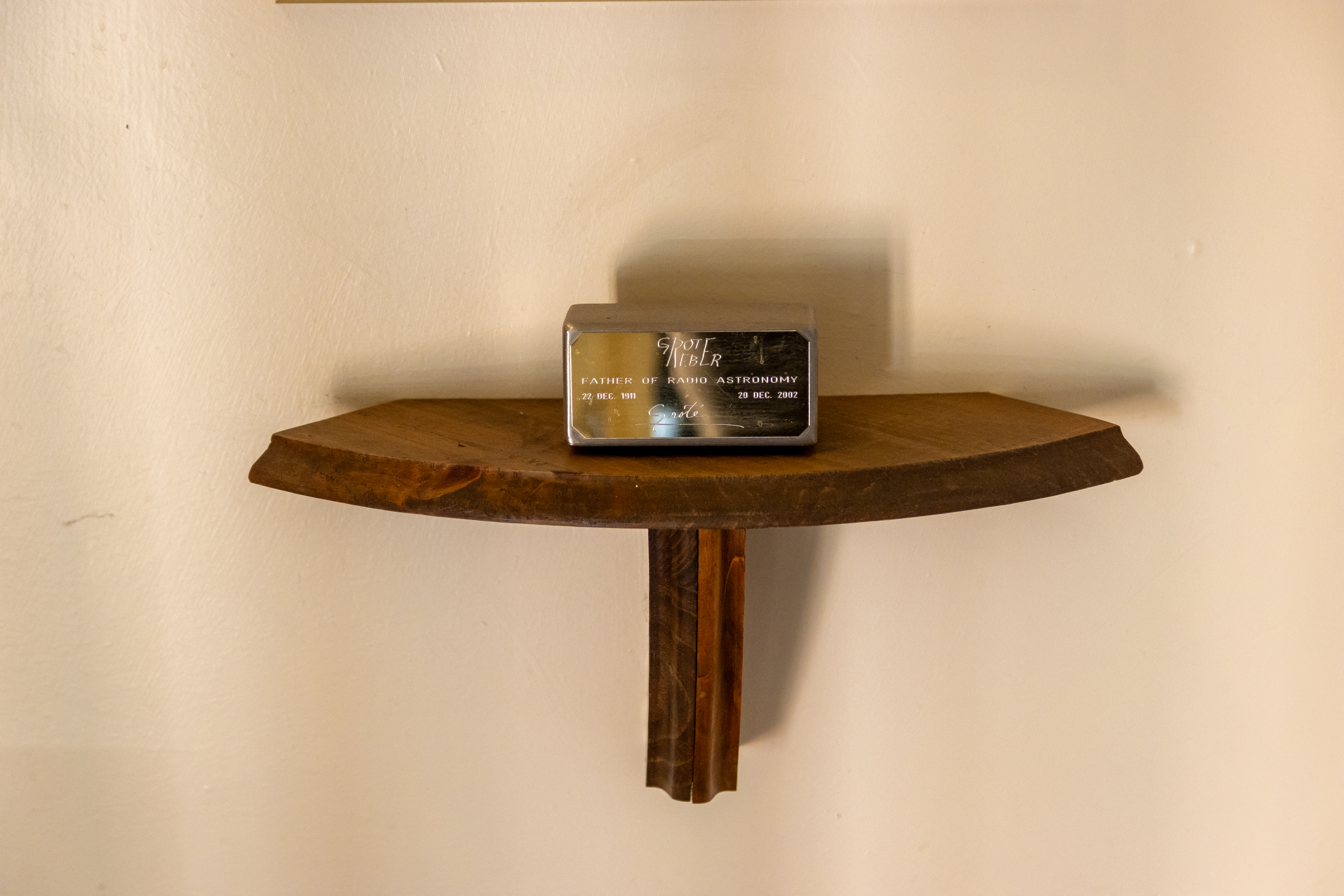
Ashes at Jodrell Bank Observatory

Reber was not a believer of the Big Bang theory; he believed that red shift was due to repeated absorption and re-emission or interaction of light and other electromagnetic radiations by low density dark matter, over intergalactic distances, and in 1977 he published an article called "Endless, Boundless, Stable Universe", which outlined his theory. Reber was supportive of the Tired light explanation for the redshift-distance relationship.

He was looked after in his final days at the Ouse District Hospital, about 50 km (30 miles) northwest of Hobart, Tasmania, where he died in 2002, two days before his 91st birthday.

== Honorary awards ==
- Honorary Doctor of Science degree from Ohio State University (1962)
- Bruce Medal of the Astronomical Society of the Pacific (1962)
- Henry Norris Russell Lectureship (1962)
- Elliott Cresson Medal of the Franklin Institute (physics, 1963)
- Jackson-Gwilt Medal of the Royal Astronomical Society (1983)

== Legacy ==
- Asteroid 6886 Grote
- The Grote Reber Medal was established by the Trustees of the Grote Reber Foundation.
- Grote Reber Museum at the Mount Pleasant Radio Observatory, Cambridge, Tasmania, opened 20 January 2008

== See also ==
- John D. Kraus
- Radiophysics
