= Reber Radio Telescope =

- U.S. National Register of Historic Places
- U.S. National Historic Landmark
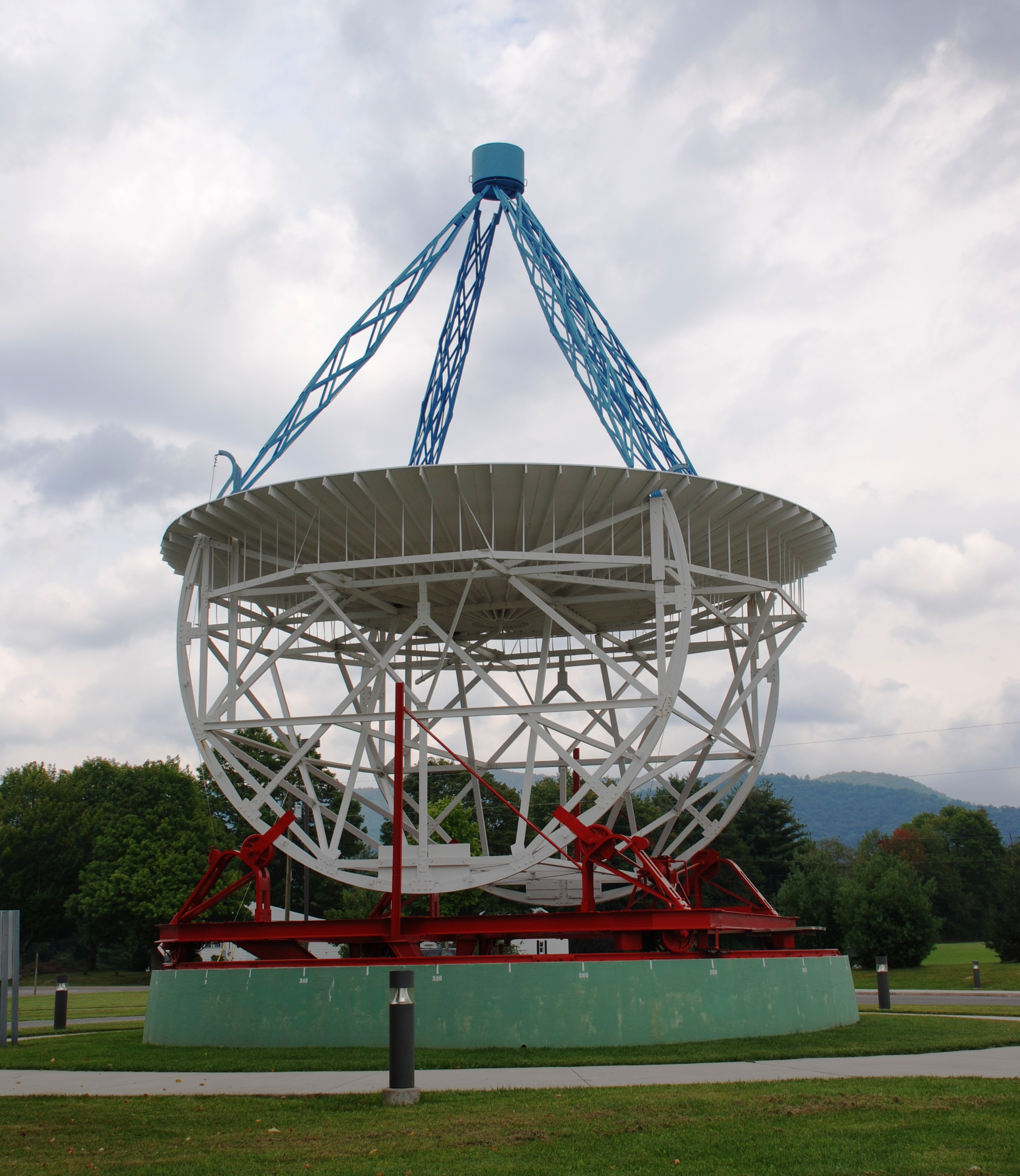
- Reber Radio Telescope

- Location within West Virginia Location within the United States
- Nearest city: Green Bank, West Virginia
- Coordinates: 38°25′48.61″N 79°49′4.45″W
- Area: less than one acre
- Built: 1937
- Architect: Grote Reber
- NRHP reference No.: 72001291

Significant dates
- Added to NRHP: November 9, 1972
- Designated NHL: December 20, 1989

The Reber Radio Telescope is a historic radio telescope, located at the Green Bank Observatory near Green Bank, West Virginia, United States. Built in 1937 in Illinois by the astronomer Grote Reber, it was the first purpose-built parabolic radio telescope. It was designated a National Historic Landmark in 1989.

== Description and history ==
The Reber Radio Telescope is located on the grounds of the Green Bank Observatory (formerly part of the National Radio Astronomy Observatory) in rural Pocahontas County, West Virginia. It consists of a parabolic reflector composed of 72 radial rafters and covered in 26 gauge iron sheeting with a focal length of 20 feet (6.1 m). It is 31 feet 5 inches (9.58 m) in diameter and is mounted on arched rails positioned on railroad wheels, allowing its angle of elevation to be controlled.

The telescope was built by Reber in his back yard in Wheaton, Illinois, in 1937, following up on the research of Karl Jansky, the discoverer in 1933 of radio waves emanating from the Milky Way. It was the second radio telescope ever built (after Jansky's dipole array), and the first parabolic radio telescope, serving as a prototype for the first large dish radio telescopes such as the Green Bank Telescope and Lovell Telescope constructed after World War II. Reber was the world's only radio astronomer at the time and his construction of the telescope, and the sky surveys he did with it, helped to found the field of radio astronomy, revealing radio sources such as Cassiopeia A and Cygnus X-1 for the first time.

Reber sold the telescope to the US National Bureau of Standards and it was moved to Sterling, Virginia. It later became the property of the National Radio Astronomy Observatory (NRAO) and was moved to Boulder, Colorado, before being moved to the Green Bank facility.

It was listed on the National Register of Historic Places in 1972 and declared a National Historic Landmark in 1989.

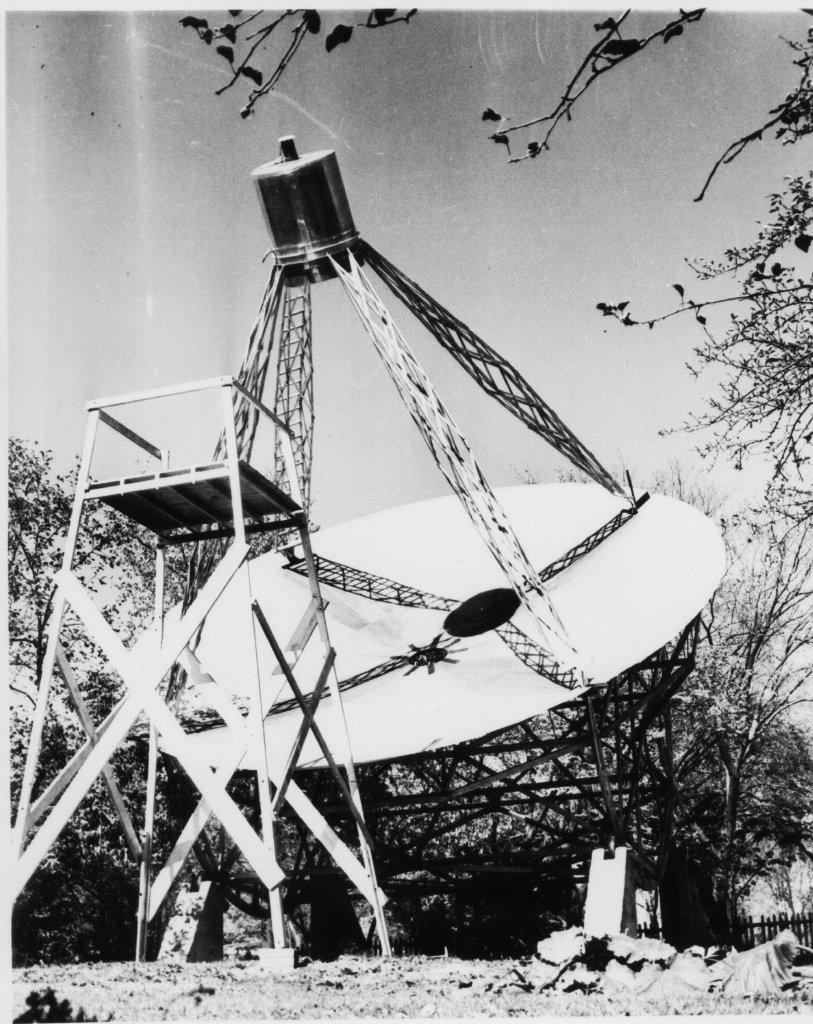
The radio telescope in Reber's back yard in Wheaton, Illinois

== See also ==
- National Register of Historic Places listings in Pocahontas County, West Virginia
- List of National Historic Landmarks in West Virginia
