= James C. G. Walker =

South African-American physicist (1939–2022)

- Born: James Callan Gray Wessel Walker; January 31, 1939; Johannesburg, South Africa
- Died: December 10, 2022 (aged 83); Ann Arbor, Michigan, U.S.
- Spouse(s): Ann Lagerquist (m. 1959 - div. 1982); Donna Wessel Walker (m. 1982)
- Scientific career
- Education: Yale University (BS); Columbia University (PhD)
- Known for: Arecibo message
- Fields: Geology; geophysics; radio astronomy
- Workplaces: University of Michigan
- Thesis: The day airglow and the heating of the upper atmosphere (1964)

James Callan Gray Wessel Walker (January 31, 1939 – December 10, 2022) was a South African and naturalized-American geophysicist. He was Arthur F. Thurnau Professor of Atmospheric, Oceanic and Space Sciences at the University of Michigan. He directed studies of the ionosphere at the Arecibo Observatory and aided in the design of the Arecibo message in 1974.

== Early life and education ==
Walker was born in 1939 in Johannesburg, South Africa. He attended the Cordwalles Preparatory School in Pietermaritzburg and showed a precocious talent for mathematics at a young age. One teacher wrote that he had "one of the best mathematical [minds] I have encountered here in 29 years". He graduated from Michaelhouse, a boarding school in the province of Natal, in 1956.

He was awarded a scholarship to attend Yale University by the Robin Line of the Seas Shipping Company, graduating in 1960. Walker went on to study geophysics and planetary science at Columbia University, where he made geomagnetic observations in the Arctic Ocean, including on Fletcher's Ice Island and the Arlis II drift station in the summer of 1961. He studied under Robert Jastrow, a prominent planetary scientist associated with the Lamont–Doherty Earth Observatory, and published a dissertation on heating in the upper atmosphere. He graduated from Columbia with a doctorate in 1964.

== Career ==
After graduating from Columbia, Walker became a postdoctoral researcher at Queen's University Belfast in Northern Ireland. He completed a second postdoctoral appointment at NASA Goddard Space Flight Center, where he worked as a planetary science researcher before returning to Yale to serve as a professor.

Walker became director of the Ionospheric Section at the Arecibo Observatory in Puerto Rico. There, he played a role in designing and sending the Arecibo message, the most powerful radio broadcast sent from Earth to globular star cluster Messier 13. His collaborators included Frank Drake, Carl Sagan, Richard Isaacman, and Linda M. French. He also studied exoplanetary geology and interstellar communication.

Walker joined the University of Michigan in 1980 and became a professor of atmospheric, oceanic and space sciences. He held a joint appointment in geological sciences and continued doing research on atmospheric dynamics in the Arctic. In 1993, he became Arthur F. Thurnau Professor for "outstanding innovations in undergraduate education". He studied the origin and evolution of the atmosphere of Earth and Venus and the chemical composition of the ocean. He also studied abiogenesis and the conditions on early Earth for the formation of life. Later, his research focused on the interactions of carbon dioxide in the atmosphere of Earth, changes in planetary surface temperature, and anthropogenic climate change. He directed the Environmental Studies Program at the University of Michigan from 1991 to 1998.

He retired in 2000. Walker died in Ann Arbor, Michigan in 2022, aged 83.

== Publications ==
- Evolution of the Atmosphere (Macmillan, 1977) ISBN 9780028543901
- Earth History: The Several Ages of the Earth (Jones & Bartlett, 1986) ISBN 9780867200225
- Numerical Adventures with Geochemical Cycles (Oxford University Press, 1990) ISBN 9780195045208

== Personal life ==
Walker was a lifelong activist for nonviolence and racial justice. As a graduate student at Columbia, he registered Black and Hispanic voters in New York City and participated in anti-Vietnam War demonstrations, including the 1967 March on the Pentagon. He protested the Vietnam War draft along with Abbie Hoffman, and was among the hundreds arrested, including Allen Ginsberg, for civil disobedience. In later years, Walker protested against the 2003 invasion of Iraq and organized for Moms Demand Action, Black Lives Matter, and the 2017 Women's March.

Walker married Ann Lagerquist in 1959. They had two children and were divorced in 1982. Later that year, Walker married Donna Wessel Walker. They had two additional children. Walker and his wife lived in Ann Arbor and attended St. Andrew's Episcopal Church. He won blue ribbons for baking at the Michigan State Fair and Ionia Free Fair. Walker also enjoyed Scottish country dancing and theater.
