= Frank Drake =

American astronomer and astrophysicist (1930–2022)

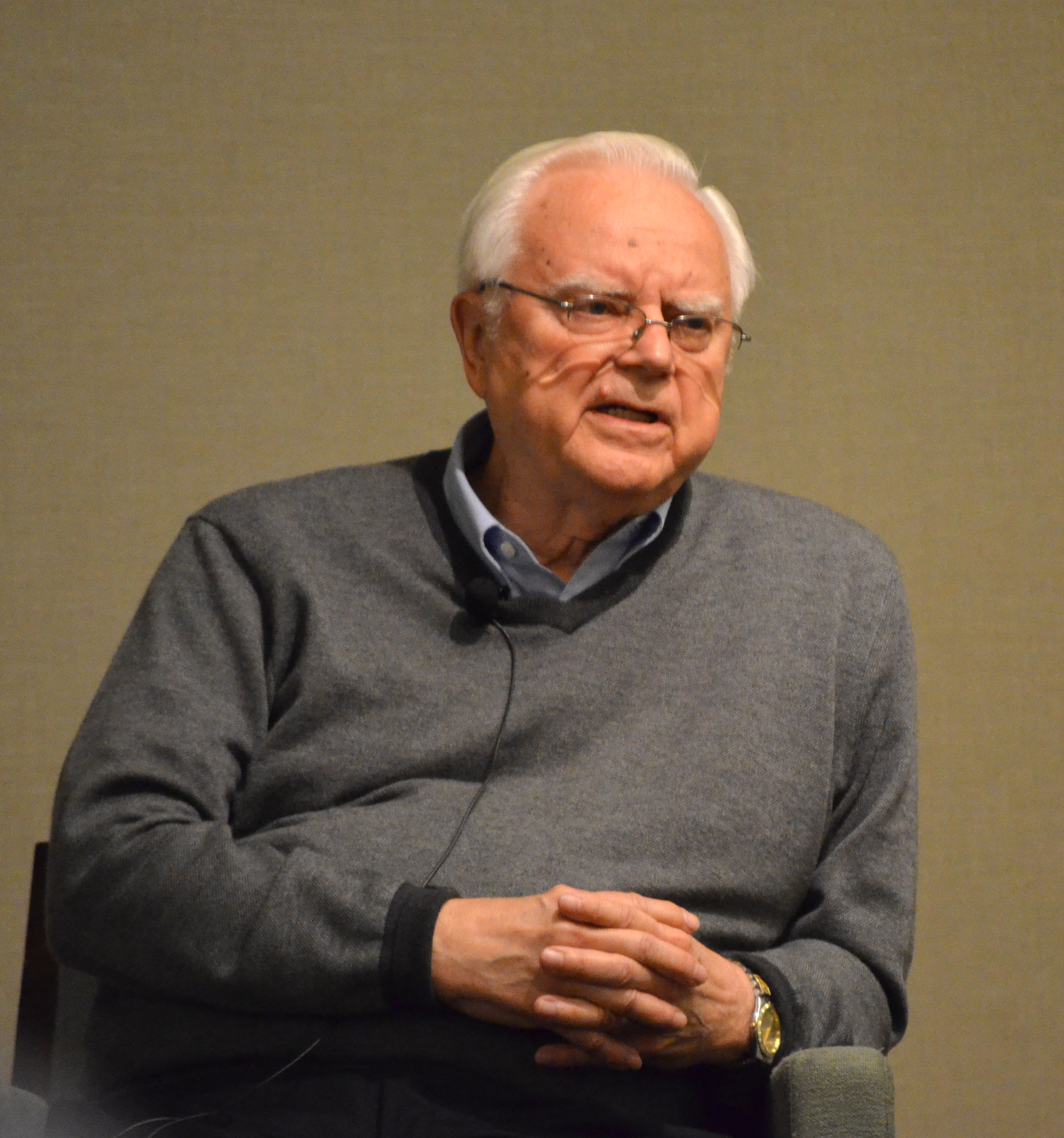
- Drake in 2012
- Born: Frank Donald Drake; May 28, 1930; Chicago, Illinois, U.S.
- Died: September 2, 2022 (aged 92); Aptos, California, U.S.
- Education: Cornell University; Harvard University
- Known for: Arecibo message; Drake equation; Pioneer plaque; Project Ozma; Voyager Golden Record
- Spouses: Elizabeth Procter Bell (m. 1952; div. 1976) Amahl Shakhashiri (m. 1978)
- Children: 5, including Nadia
- Scientific career
- Fields: Astronomy, astrophysics
- Workplaces: University of California, Santa Cruz, SETI Institute, Cornell University
- Thesis: Neutral hydrogen in galactic clusters (1958)
- Doctoral advisor: Cecilia Payne-Gaposchkin
- Doctoral students: Donald C. Backer

Frank Donald Drake (May 28, 1930 – September 2, 2022) was an American astrophysicist and astrobiologist.

He began his career as a radio astronomer, studying the planets of the Solar System and later pulsars. Drake expanded his interests to the search for extraterrestrial intelligence (SETI), beginning with Project Ozma in 1960, an attempt at extraterrestrial communication. He developed the Drake equation, which attempts to quantify the number of intelligent lifeforms that could potentially be discovered. Working with Carl Sagan, Drake helped to design the Pioneer plaque, the first physical message flown beyond the Solar System, and was part of the team that developed the Voyager Golden Record. Drake designed and implemented the Arecibo message in 1974, an extraterrestrial radio transmission of astronomical and biological information about Earth. He is the father of Advanced SETI.

Drake worked at the National Radio Astronomy Observatory, Jet Propulsion Laboratory, Cornell University, University of California, Santa Cruz, and the SETI Institute.

== Early life and education ==
Born on May 28, 1930, in Chicago, Illinois, Drake showed an early interest in electronics and chemistry. His father was a chemical engineer, and his mother a music teacher. He had two younger siblings.

He enrolled at Cornell University on a Navy Reserve Officer Training Corps scholarship. Once there he began studying astronomy. His ideas about the possibility of extraterrestrial life were reinforced by a lecture from astrophysicist Otto Struve in 1951. After receiving a B.A. in Engineering Physics, Drake served briefly as an electronics officer on the heavy cruiser USS Albany. He then went on to graduate school at Harvard University from 1952 to 1955 where he received a M.S. and Ph.D. in astronomy. His doctoral advisor was Cecilia Payne-Gaposchkin.

== Career ==
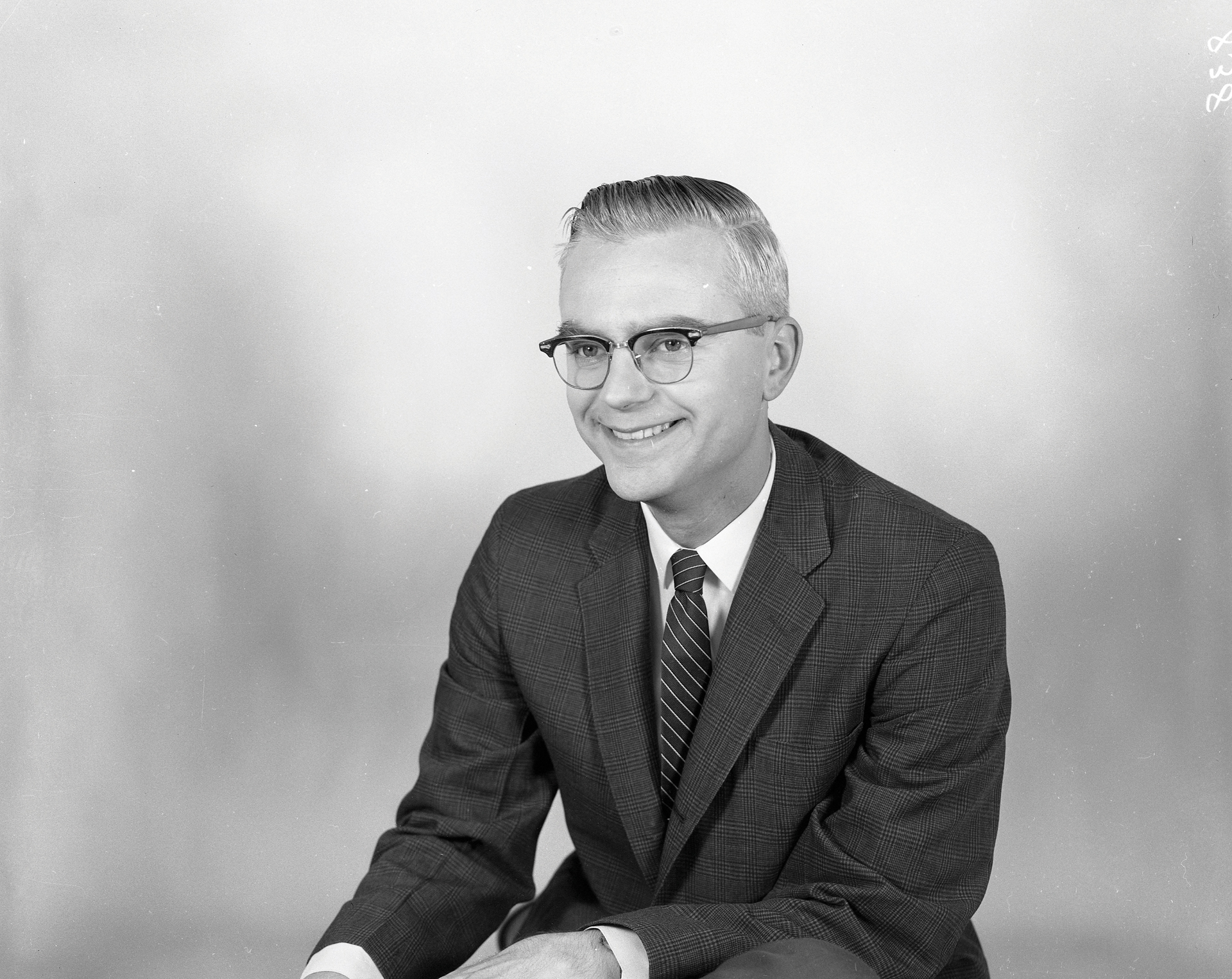
Frank Drake in the 1960s

Drake began his research career as a radio astronomer, working at the National Radio Astronomy Observatory (NRAO) in Green Bank, West Virginia from 1958 to 1963. At NRAO, he conducted research into radio emissions from the planets of the Solar System: using the radio telescope at Green Bank, Drake discovered the ionosphere and magnetosphere of Jupiter, and observed the atmosphere of Venus. He also mapped the radio emission from the Galactic Center. Drake extended the capabilities of the under-construction Arecibo Observatory to allow it to be used for radio astronomy (it was originally designed purely for ionospheric physics).

In April 1959, Drake obtained approval from the director Otto Struve of NRAO to begin Project Ozma, a search for extraterrestrial radio communications. Initially, they agreed to keep the project secret, fearing public ridicule. However, Drake decided to publicize his project after Giuseppe Cocconi and Philip Morrison published a paper in Nature in September 1959, entitled "Searching for Interstellar Communications". Drake began his Project Ozma observations in 1960, using the NRAO 26-meter radio telescope, by searching for possible signals from the star systems Tau Ceti and Epsilon Eridani. No extraterrestrial signals were detected and the project was terminated in July 1960. After learning about Project Ozma, Carl Sagan (then a graduate student) contacted Drake, initiating a lifelong collaboration between them.

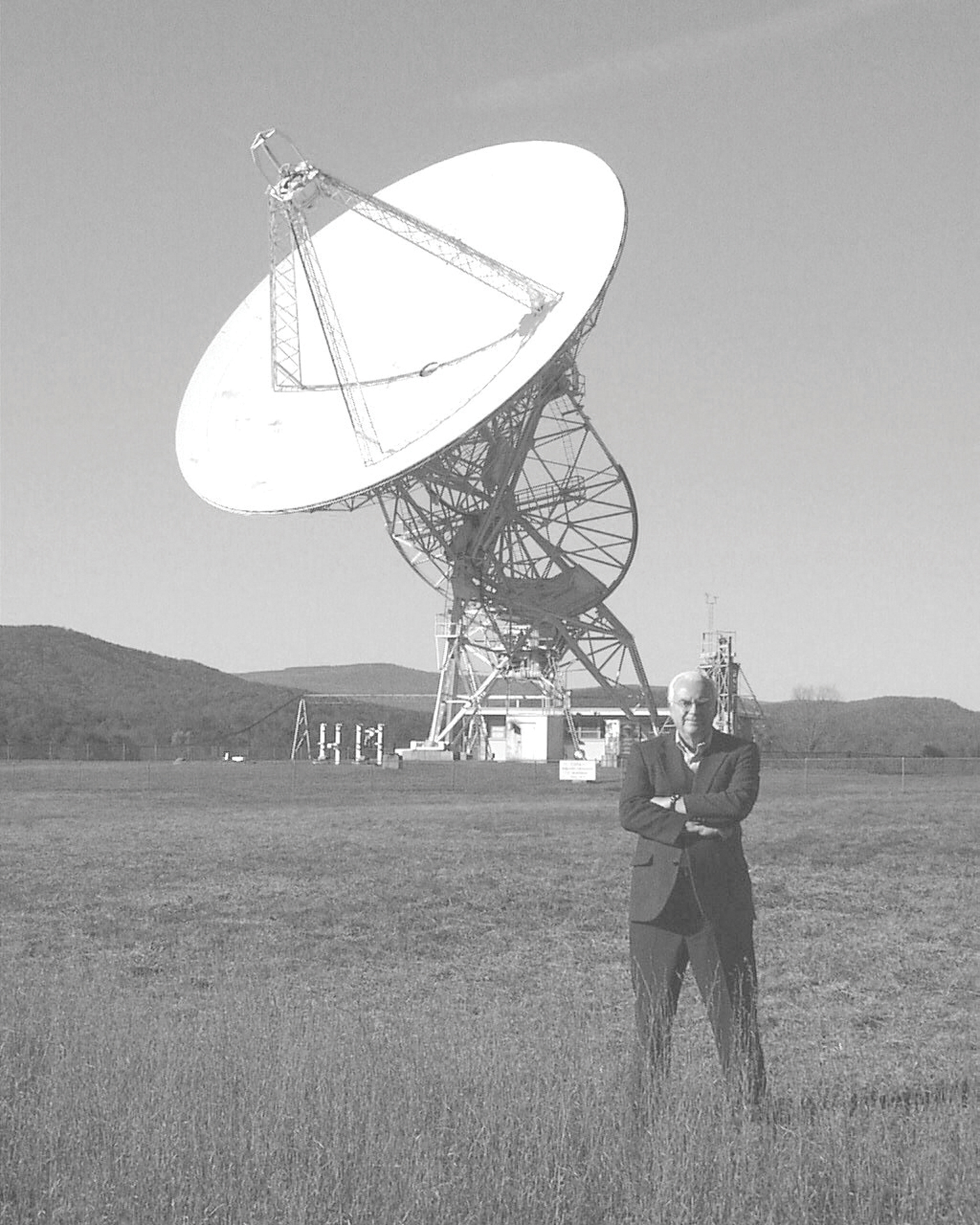
Frank Drake poses with the NRAO's first radio telescope, the 85-foot Howard E. Tatel.

In 1961, Drake devised the Drake equation, which attempted to estimate the number of extraterrestrial civilizations that might be detectable in the Milky Way. The Drake equation has been described as the "second most-famous equation in science", after E=mc^{2}.

In 1963, Drake served as section chief of Lunar and Planetary Science at the Jet Propulsion Laboratory. He returned to Cornell in 1964, this time as a member of the faculty, where he would spend the next two decades. He was promoted to Goldwin Smith Professor of Astronomy in 1976. Drake served as associate director of the Cornell Center for Radiophysics and Space Research, as director of the Arecibo Observatory from 1966 to 1968, and as director of the National Astronomy and Ionosphere Center (NAIC, which includes the Arecibo facility), from its establishment in 1971 to 1981.

In 1972, Drake co-designed the Pioneer plaque with Carl Sagan and Linda Salzman Sagan. The plaque was the first physical message sent into space and intended to be understandable by any sufficiently technologically advanced extraterrestrial lifeforms that might intercept it. In 1974, Drake wrote the Arecibo message, the first interstellar message transmitted deliberately from Earth. He later served as technical director, with Carl Sagan and Ann Druyan, in the development of the Voyager Golden Record, an improved version of the Pioneer plaque which also incorporated audio recordings.

In 1984, Drake moved to the University of California, Santa Cruz, becoming their Dean of Natural Science. The non-profit SETI Institute was founded the same year, with Drake as president of its board of trustees. Drake left his role as dean in 1988, but remained a professor at UC Santa Cruz while also becoming director of the SETI Institute's Carl Sagan Center. Drake was President of the Astronomical Society of the Pacific from 1988 to 1990. From 1989 to 1992, he was chairman of the Board of Physics and Astronomy for the National Research Council. In 1991, Drake served on an expert panel assembled by the United States Department of Energy with the aim of assessing the effectiveness of various long-term nuclear waste warning messages to be implemented at New Mexico's Waste Isolation Pilot Plant. He retired from teaching in 1996 but remained emeritus professor of astronomy and astrophysics at UCSC. In 2010, Drake stepped down as director of The Carl Sagan Center but continued to serve on the SETI Institute's board of trustees.

On the subject of the search for the existence of extraterrestrial life, Drake said: "[A]s far as I know, the most fascinating, interesting thing you could find in the universe is not another kind of star or galaxy … but another kind of life."

== Personal life ==
Frank Drake (center) editing this article in 2008

Drake's hobbies included lapidary and the cultivation of orchids.

Drake married musician Elizabeth Bell in 1953; they divorced in 1976. They had three sons. In 1978, Drake married Amahl Shakhashiri, with whom he had two daughters, including science journalist Nadia Drake.

Drake died on September 2, 2022, at his home in Aptos, California, from natural causes at the age of 92.

== Honors ==
- Asteroid 4772 Frankdrake is named after him.
- Elected to the National Academy of Sciences in 1972
- Elected to the American Academy of Arts and Sciences in 1974.
- 2001 Drake award from the SETI Institute
- 2018 National Space Society's Space Pioneer Award for Science and Engineering
- The Drake Lounge at the Green Bank Observatory is named after him

== See also ==
- Lick Observatory
- The Farthest, a 2017 documentary on the Voyager program
- The Search for Life: The Drake Equation
