= Cosmos (2019 film) =

2019 film by Elliot and Zander Weaver

- Poster
- Directed by: Elliot Weaver; Zander Weaver
- Written by: Elliot Weaver; Zander Weaver
- Produced by: Elliot Weaver; Zander Weaver
- Starring: Tom England; Joshua Ford; Arjun Singh Panam; Ben Vardy
- Cinematography: Elliot Weaver; Zander Weaver
- Edited by: Elliot Weaver; Zander Weaver
- Music by: Chris Davey; Chris Duncan; Mark Heath
- Production company: Elliander Pictures
- Distributed by: Gravitas Ventures
- Release dates: 14 July 2019 (United Kingdom); 7 November 2019 (Los Angeles)
- Running time: 128 minutes
- Country: United Kingdom
- Language: English
- Budget: $7,000

Cosmos is a 2019 science fiction film written, directed and produced by Elliot and Zander Weaver in their feature film debut. The film stars Tom England, Joshua Ford, Arjun Singh Panam and Ben Vardy. It was released in late 2019 in the United States.

== Plot ==
Three young astronomers are baffled once the newest team member discovers radio signals of a seemingly impossible origin on 1420.163 MHz, in the water hole. After an unexplained power surge deletes crucial recordings, the team members unite and discover that the radio signals resolve to a response to the Arecibo message, a message beamed into space via radio waves in 1974, broadcast by a spacecraft in low Earth orbit using a cloaking system that renders the craft invisible on the visual spectrum but visible in infrared. After the team race to a local radio telescope array to get a new battery when a low battery threatens to halt their investigation, it turns out that the team were the first to receive and identify the message. At the finale, SETI coordinates a global message to be beamed to the craft: "Welcome to Earth", at which point the craft decloaks.

== Cast ==
- Tom England
- Joshua Ford
- Arjun Singh Panam
- Ben Vardy

== Production ==
The film was made in Birmingham, England. Pre-production started in 2013 followed by principal photography in 2015. The film took five years to make and was shot on the Blackmagic Pocket Cinema Camera 1080p. Other than the soundtrack, the Weavers handled the majority of post-production duties themselves. It is their feature film debut.

== Release ==
A trailer was released on 12 November 2018. The film had a theatrical and on demand release on 8 November 2019. It was distributed by Gravitas Ventures.

The film has only been released as region 1 on DVD and Blu-Ray due to Gravitas Ventures not owning the world rights for the film.

== Reception ==
A review at HorrorBuzz compared the film to Close Encounters of the Third Kind and Arrival, calling it a "must see." Philip Henry at Movie Burner Entertainment claimed the script had imperfections but that they did not deter from it being compelling. Pedram Türkoğlu compared it to Contact, dealing with radio wave detection. Skyline Indie Film Festival recommended the film.

== See also ==
- Wow! signal – 1977 narrowband radio signal from SETI
