= The Search for Life: The Drake Equation =

2010 BBC documentary

The Search for Life: The Drake Equation is a 2010 BBC Four television documentary about that equation, which is a probabilistic argument used to estimate the number of active, communicative extraterrestrial civilizations in the Milky Way galaxy. It was presented by Dallas Campbell.

While the Bang Goes the Theory series was committed to production only after the Drake program had aired, the initially separate single show was later included on its successor's Series 1 & 2 DVD set.
