= Linda M. French =

American astronomer (1951-2025)

- Born: Linda May French; March 23, 1951; New Castle, Indiana, U.S.
- Died: November 9, 2025 (aged 74); Exeter, New Hampshire, U.S.
- Known for: Arecibo message

Academic background
- Education: Indiana University Bloomington (BA); Cornell University (MS, PhD)
- Thesis: Photometric properties of carbonaceous chondrites and related materials (1980)
- Doctoral advisor: Carl Sagan

Academic work
- Institutions: Massachusetts Institute of Technology; Wheelock College; Illinois Wesleyan University
- Main interests: Astronomy; asteroids; comets; history of astronomy; interstellar communication

Linda May French (March 23, 1951 – November 9, 2025) was an American astronomer. She specialized in the physical properties of asteroids and comets, including their shapes and surfaces. She was also interested in astronomy education and in the history of astronomy, particularly focusing on the life of the 18th-century deaf British astronomer John Goodricke. She was a professor emerita of physics at Illinois Wesleyan University and helped develop the Arecibo message in 1974.

== Education and career ==
French was originally from Hagerstown, Indiana, and first made plans for becoming an astronomer at age five, after being given a children's book on astronomy. But as a student at Indiana University, she went through English and education majors before returning to astronomy after taking a junior-year general education course in the subject. She graduated from Indiana University in 1973, with an A.B. in astronomy and a minor in physics. She then went to Cornell University for graduate study in astronomy, where she worked as a teaching assistant for Carl Sagan, earned a master's degree in 1977, and completed her Ph.D. in 1980.

After a one-year visiting assistant professorship at Bates College, she was a postdoctoral researcher and lecturer at the Massachusetts Institute of Technology from 1982 to 1988, a researcher at the Air Force Geophysics Laboratory at Hanscom Air Force Base in Massachusetts from 1988 to 1989, and a pre-secondary science teacher at The Park School in Brookline, Massachusetts from 1989 to 1992, before returning to academia as an associate professor of physics at Wheelock College in Boston in 1992. She moved to Illinois Wesleyan University in 2002, and was promoted to full professor in 2008.

She was a program director at the National Science Foundation for a three-year term beginning circa 2017.

She died in 2025 in Exeter, New Hampshire, aged 74.

== Recognition ==
Asteroid 3506 French was named after French in 1988. In 2016, Illinois Wesleyan University gave her their highest teaching award, the Kemp Foundation Award for Teaching Excellence. French was named a Legacy Fellow of the American Astronomical Society in 2020.
