= Human height by country =

Below is a table which reports the average adult human height by country or geographical region.

== Accuracy ==
Methodology and the demographic measured varies, so figures across countries are not necessarily comparable.

As with any statistical data, the accuracy of the findings may be challenged: test subjects may have been invited instead of random sampling, resulting in sampling bias. Some studies may allow subjects to self-report values. Generally speaking, self-reported height tends to be taller than measured height, although the overestimation of height depends on the reporting subject's height, age, gender and region.

== Worldwide ==
According to the 2007 growth references of the World Health Organization, a statistic reconstruction based on the USA old NCHS data samples of 1977, the median height of 19-year old boys raised under optimal environmental conditions was 176.5 cm (5 ft 9 1/2 in), with 98% having heights between 159.6 cm (5 ft 3 in) and 193.5 cm (6 ft 4 in). The median height of 19-year-old girls raised in the same conditions was 163.2 cm (5 ft 4 1/2 in), with 98% having heights between 147.9 cm (4 ft 10 in) and 178.4 cm (5 ft 10 in). The total sample size was 22,917: 11,410 boys, 11,507 girls. For the indicator height-for-age, 8 boys (0.07%), including an 18 month-old with length 51.6 cm, and 14 girls (0.12%) had outlier height measurements that were set to missing in the data set. As a result, 321 observations for boys (2.8%) and 356 observations for girls (3.0%) were excluded. The growth curves for ages 5 to 19 years were thus constructed using data from 18 months to 24 years. The final sample used for fitting the growth curves included 30,907 observations (15,537 boys, 15,370 girls) for the height-for-age curves, 30,100 observations (15,136 boys, 14,964 girls) for the weight-for-age curves, and 30,018 observations (15,103 boys, 14,915 girls) for the BMI-for-age curves. Such reference curves cannot be applied with the same effectiveness across all populations, as several studies demonstrated: growth reference selection introduces systematic measurement bias into many countries such as Israele, Pacific Islander,, Poland,, Russia,, Spain and so on.

According to a 2016 study by NCD-RisC, the average adult height of people born in 1996 was 171.3 cm (5 ft 7 1/2 in) for men and 159.5 cm (5 ft 3 in) cm for women.

According to 2023 geographical study by Asutosh Goswami et al., 95% of the global population has a height between 150 cm (4 ft 11 in) and 165 cm (5 ft 5 in).

== Table by country ==
Green: denotes measured figures

Note: where available, standard deviation (SD) is listed under sample population / age range

- N = number of people sampled
- m = number of males sampled
- f = number of females sampled

Country or region	Average male height	Average female height	Stature ratio (male to female)	Sample population / age range	Method	Period	Ref.
Afghanistan	168.2 cm (5 ft 6 in)	155.3 cm (5 ft 1 in)	1.08	18–69 (N= m:1,979 f:1,687)	Measured	2018	
Albania	174 cm (5 ft 8 1/2 in)	161.8 cm (5 ft 3 1/2 in)	1.08	20–29 (N= m:649 f:1,806)	Measured	2008–2009	
Algeria	169.7 cm (5 ft 7 in)	158.5 cm (5 ft 2 1/2 in)	1.07	25–64 (N= m:1,626 f:2,491)	Measured	2005	
Armenia	171.5 cm (5 ft 7 1/2 in)	159.2 cm (5 ft 2 1/2 in)	1.08	18–69 (N= m:605 f:1,449)	Measured	2016	
Australia	174.8 cm (5 ft 9 in)	161.6 cm (5 ft 3 1/2 in)	1.08	15–85+ (N= m:6,591 f:7,219)	Measured	2022	
Azerbaijan	172.3 cm (5 ft 8 in)	161.1 cm (5 ft 3 1/2 in)	1.07	18–69 (N= m:1,123 f:1,591)	Measured	2017	
Bahrain	165.1 cm (5 ft 5 in)	154.2 cm (5 ft 1/2 in)	1.07	19+ (N= m:1,120 f:1,181, SD= m:9.0 cm (3.5 in) f:7.8 cm (3.1 in))	Measured	2002	
Bangladesh	162.1 cm (5 ft 4 in)	150.3 cm (4 ft 11 in)	1.08	25+ (N= m:4,312 f:4,963)	Measured	2009–10	
Belarus	175.9 cm (5 ft 9 1/2 in)	164.5 cm (5 ft 5 in)	1.07	18–69 (N= m:2,089 f:2,921)	Measured	2016–2017	
Belize	166.3 cm (5 ft 5 1/2 in)	154.5 cm (5 ft 1 in)	1.08	20+ (N= m:999 f:1,440)	Measured	2010	
Benin	167.6 cm (5 ft 6 in)	160.3 cm (5 ft 3 in)	1.05	18–69 (N= m:2,304 f:2,543)	Measured	2015	
Bhutan	163.9 cm (5 ft 4 1/2 in)	153.2 cm (5 ft 1/2 in)	1.07	18–69 (N= m:1,071 f:1,678)	Measured	2014	
Bolivia	—N/a	151.8 cm (5 ft 0 in)	—N/a	25–49 (N= f:10,302, SD= f:5.9 cm (2.3 in))	Self-reported	2003	
Bolivia	162 cm (5 ft 4 in)	149 cm (4 ft 10 1/2 in)	1.09	Aymara, 20–29	Measured	1970s	
Botswana	170.9 cm (5 ft 7 1/2 in)	160.9 cm (5 ft 3 1/2 in)	1.06	15–69 (N= m:1,299 f:2,611)	Measured	2014	
Brazil	170.7 cm (5 ft 7 in)	158.8 cm (5 ft 2 1/2 in)	1.07	18+ (N= m:62,037 f:65,696)	Measured	2009	
Brazil – Urban	173.5 cm (5 ft 8 1/2 in)	161.6 cm (5 ft 3 1/2 in)	1.07	20–24 (N= m:6,360 f:6,305)	Measured	2009	
Brazil – Rural	170.9 cm (5 ft 7 1/2 in)	158.9 cm (5 ft 2 1/2 in)	1.08	20–24 (N= m:1,939 f:1,633)	Measured	2009	
Brunei	165 cm (5 ft 5 in)	152 cm (5 ft 0 in)	1.09	19+ (N= m:696 f:828)	Measured	2010–2011	
Burkina Faso	170.6 cm (5 ft 7 in)	162.3 cm (5 ft 4 in)	1.05	25–64 (N= m:2,224 f:2,252)	Measured	2013	
Cambodia	161.7 cm (5 ft 3 1/2 in)	151.9 cm (5 ft 0 in)	1.06	25–64 (N= m:1,881 f:3,430)	Measured	2010	
Cameroon – Urban	170.6 cm (5 ft 7 in)	161.3 cm (5 ft 3 1/2 in)	1.06	15+ (N= m:3,746 f:5,078)	Measured	2003	
Central African Republic	—N/a	158.9 cm (5 ft 2 1/2 in)	—N/a	25–49 (N= f:1,408, SD= f:6.6 cm (2.6 in))	Self-reported	1994	
China	169.6 cm (5 ft 7 in)	158.9 cm (5 ft 2 1/2 in)	1.07	18+ (N= m/f:57,754, average age 48)	Measured	2008–15	
Colombia	170.6 cm (5 ft 7 in)	158.7 cm (5 ft 2 1/2 in)	1.07	18–22 (N= m:1,528,875 f:1,468,110)	Measured	2002	
Congo, Democratic Republic of the	—N/a	157.7 cm (5 ft 2 in)	—N/a	25–49 (N= f:2,727, SD= f:8.0 cm (3.1 in))	Self-reported	2005	
Congo, Republic of the	—N/a	159 cm (5 ft 2 1/2 in)	—N/a	25–49 (N= f:3,922, SD= f:8.1 cm (3.2 in))	Self-reported	2007	
Costa Rica – San José	169.4 cm (5 ft 6 1/2 in)	155.9 cm (5 ft 1 1/2 in)	1.09	20+ (N= m:523 f:904)	Measured	2010	
East Timor	162.0 cm (5 ft 4 in)	154.8 cm (5 ft 1 in)	1.05	18–44 (N= m:830 f:1,338)	Measured	2023	
Ecuador	167.1 cm (5 ft 6 in)	154.2 cm (5 ft 1/2 in)	1.08	—N/a	Measured	2014	
Egypt	170.3 cm (5 ft 7 in)	158.9 cm (5 ft 2 1/2 in)	1.07	20–24 (N= m:845 f:1,059)	Measured	2008	
El Salvador	—N/a	160.3 cm (5 ft 3 in)	—N/a	25–49	Self-reported	2007	
England	175.3 cm (5 ft 9 in)	161.9 cm (5 ft 3 1/2 in)	1.08	—N/a	Measured	2012	
Eswatini	168.4 cm (5 ft 6 1/2 in)	158.9 cm (5 ft 2 1/2 in)	1.06	15–69 (N= m:1,107 f:1,993)	Measured	2014	
Ethiopia	167.6 cm (5 ft 6 in)	158.1 cm (5 ft 2 in)	1.06	15–69 (N= m:3,917 f:5,757)	Measured	2015	
Fiji	173.4 cm (5 ft 8 1/2 in)	161.2 cm (5 ft 3 1/2 in)	1.08	15–64 (N: m:2,685 f:2,859)	Measured	2002	
France	174.1 cm (5 ft 8 1/2 in)	161.9 cm (5 ft 3 1/2 in)	1.08	20+	Measured	2001	
Gabon	171 cm (5 ft 7 1/2 in)	160.9 cm (5 ft 3 1/2 in)	1.06	15–64 (N= m:1,054 f:1,634, SD= m:7.2 cm (2.8 in) f:6.7 cm (2.6 in))	Measured	2009	
The Gambia	167.2 cm (5 ft 6 in)	160.3 cm (5 ft 3 in)	1.04	25–64 (N= m:1,633 f:1,940, SD= m:11.7 cm (4.6 in) f:9.8 cm (3.9 in))	Measured	2011	
The Gambia – Rural	168 cm (5 ft 6 in)	157.8 cm (5 ft 2 in)	1.06	21–49 (N= m:9,559 f:13,160, SD= m:6.7 cm (2.6 in) f:5.6 cm (2.2 in))	Measured	1950–1974	
Georgia	173.8 cm (5 ft 8 1/2 in)	161.2 cm (5 ft 3 1/2 in)	1.08	18–69 (N= m:1,271 f:2,933)	Measured	2016	
Germany	175.4 cm (5 ft 9 in)	162.8 cm (5 ft 4 in)	1.08	18–79 (N= m/f:19,768)	—N/a	2007	
Guatemala	160.1 cm (5 ft 3 in)	148.1 cm (4 ft 10 1/2 in)	1.08	15–59 (N= m:6,624(15–59) f:15,211(15–49))	Measured	2008–2009	
Guinea	—N/a	158.8 cm (5 ft 2 1/2 in)	—N/a	25–49 (N= f:2,563, SD= f:6.3 cm (2.5 in))	Self-reported	2005	
Guyana	169.0 cm (5 ft 6 1/2 in)	157.1 cm (5 ft 2 in)	1.08	18–69 (N= m:1,062 f:1,576)	Measured	2016	
Haiti	—N/a	158.6 cm (5 ft 2 1/2 in)	—N/a	25–49 (N= f:2,932, SD= f:6.5 cm (2.6 in))	Self-reported	2005	
Honduras – Tegucigalpa	167.2 cm (5 ft 6 in)	153.9 cm (5 ft 1/2 in)	1.09	20+ (N= m:644 f:1,052)	Measured	2010	
Honduras	—N/a	152 cm (5 ft 0 in)	—N/a	25–49 (N= f:11,219, SD= f:6.4 cm (2.5 in))	Self-reported	2005	
India	163.7 cm (5 ft 4 1/2 in)	152.0 cm (5 ft 0 in)	1.08	26–50	Measured	2015–16	
India — Hindu	163.6 cm (5 ft 4 1/2 in)	151.8 cm (5 ft 0 in)	1.08	26–50	Measured	2015–16	
India — Muslim	163.8 cm (5 ft 4 1/2 in)	152.3 cm (5 ft 0 in)	1.08	26–50	Measured	2015–16	
India — Christian	163.9 cm (5 ft 4 1/2 in)	152.6 cm (5 ft 0 in)	1.07	26–50	Measured	2015–16	
India — Sikh	168.3 cm (5 ft 6 1/2 in)	156.1 cm (5 ft 1 1/2 in)	1.08	26–50	Measured	2015–16	
Indonesia	164 cm (5 ft 4 1/2 in)	154.1 cm (5 ft 1/2 in)	1.06	18 (N= m/f:>300,000; Jakarta: male average = 165.1 cm, female average = 155.6 cm)	Measured	2018	
Iran	170.3 cm (5 ft 7 in)	157.2 cm (5 ft 2 in)	1.08	21+ (N= m/f:89,532, SD= m:8.05 cm (3.2 in) f:7.22 cm (2.8 in))	Measured	2005	
Iran	173.4 cm (5 ft 8 1/2 in)	159.9 cm (5 ft 3 in)	1.09	20–25	Measured	2005	
Iraq	171.3 cm (5 ft 7 1/2 in)	157.5 cm (5 ft 2 in)	1.09	18+ (N= m:1,596 f:2,318)	Measured	2015	
Italy	172.9 cm (5 ft 8 in)	158.8 cm (5 ft 2 1/2 in)	1.09	35–74 (N= m:6243 f:6187; SD= m:7.2 cm (2.8 in) f:6.6 cm (2.6 in))	Measured	1998–2002, 2008–2012, 2018–19	
Ivory Coast	170.1 cm (5 ft 7 in)	159.1 cm (5 ft 2 1/2 in)	1.07	25–29 (SD= m:6.7 cm (2.6 in) f:5.67 cm (2.2 in))	Measured, but realistic results	1985–1987	
Jamaica	171.8 cm (5 ft 7 1/2 in)	160.8 cm (5 ft 3 1/2 in)	1.07	25–74	Measured, but realistic results	1994–1996	
Japan	171.8 cm (5 ft 7 1/2 in)	158.6 cm (5 ft 2 1/2 in)	1.08	18–49 (N= m:10,131 f:8,984)	Measured	2018	
Jordan	173 cm (5 ft 8 in)	159 cm (5 ft 2 1/2 in)	1.09	18–69 (N= m:2,203 f:3,510)	Measured	2019	
Kazakhstan	—N/a	159.8 cm (5 ft 3 in)	—N/a	25–49 (N= f:1,600, SD= f:6.3 cm (2.5 in))	Self-reported	1999	
Kenya	169.6 cm (5 ft 7 in)	158.2 cm (5 ft 2 1/2 in)	1.07	25–49 (N= f:4,856, SD= f:7.3 cm (2.9 in))	Self-reported	2016	
Kiribati	170.7 cm (5 ft 7 in)	158.4 cm (5 ft 2 1/2 in)	1.08	18–69 (N= f:566 m:698)	Measured	2015–2016	
North Korea	165.6 cm (5 ft 5 in)	154.9 cm (5 ft 1 in)	1.07	Defectors, 20–39 (N= m/f:1,075)	Measured	2005	
Kuwait	172 cm (5 ft 7 1/2 in)	158.6 cm (5 ft 2 1/2 in)	1.08	18–69 (N= m:1,385 f:2,232)	Measured	2013–2014	
Kyrgyzstan	169.9 cm (5 ft 7 in)	158.0 cm (5 ft 2 in)	1.08	25–64 (N= m:943 f:1,601)	Measured	2015	
Laos – Vientiane	162.2 cm (5 ft 4 in)	153.4 cm (5 ft 1/2 in)	1.06	25–64 (N= m:1,635 f:2,430)	Measured	2008	
Lebanon	174.1 cm (5 ft 8 1/2 in)	162.4 cm (5 ft 4 in)	1.07	18–69 (N= m:736 f:992)	Measured	2016–2017	
Lesotho	—N/a	157.6 cm (5 ft 2 in)	—N/a	25–49 (N= f:1,879, SD= f:6.7 cm (2.6 in))	Self-reported	2004	
Liberia	161.1 cm (5 ft 3 1/2 in)	154.2 cm (5 ft 1/2 in)	1.04	25–64 (m:982 f:1,237)	Measured	2011	
Madagascar – Antananarivo Province	163 cm (5 ft 4 in)	154 cm (5 ft 1/2 in)	1.06	25–64 (N= m:1,102 f:1,112)	Measured	2005	
Madagascar	—N/a	154.3 cm (5 ft 1/2 in)	—N/a	25–49 (N= f:5,024, SD= f:6.0 cm (2.4 in))	Self-reported	2003	
Malaysia	165.2 cm (5 ft 5 in)	154.4 cm (5 ft 1 in)	1.07	25–64 (N= m:1,044 f:1,528)	Measured	2005	
Malaysia	166.3 cm (5 ft 5 1/2 in)	154.7 cm (5 ft 1 in)	1.07	Malay, 20–24 (N= m:749 f:893, SD= m:6.46 cm (2.5 in) f:6.04 cm (2.4 in))better ptevious with larger sample)	Measured	1996	
Malawi	164.3 cm (5 ft 4 1/2 in)	155.4 cm (5 ft 1 in)	1.06	25–64 (N= m:1,669 f:3,454)	Measured	2009	
Maldives	164.7 cm (5 ft 5 in)	153 cm (5 ft 0 in)	1.08	15–64 (N= m:661 f:1,103)	Measured	2011	
Malta	175.2 cm (5 ft 9 in)	165.3 cm (5 ft 5 in)	1.06	25–34	Self-reported	2003	
Marshall Islands	163.3 cm (5 ft 4 1/2 in)	151.6 cm (4 ft 11 1/2 in)	1.08	15–64 (N= m:762 f:1,187)	Measured	2002	
Mauritania	167.9 cm (5 ft 6 in)	160.3 cm (5 ft 3 in)	1.05	15–64 (N= m:1,141 f:1,362)	Measured	2006	
Mexico	172 cm (5 ft 7 1/2 in)	159 cm (5 ft 2 1/2 in)	1.08	20–65	Measured	2014	
Micronesia, Federated States of	169.2 cm (5 ft 6 1/2 in)	158.9 cm (5 ft 2 1/2 in)	1.06	25–64 (N= m:634 f:1,212)	Measured	2006	
Moldova	173 cm (5 ft 8 in)	161.8 cm (5 ft 3 1/2 in)	1.07	18–69 (N= m:1,711 f:2,772)	Measured	2013	
Moldova	—N/a	161.2 cm (5 ft 3 1/2 in)	—N/a	25–49 (N= f:4,757, SD= f:6.2 cm (2.4 in))	Self-reported	2005	
Mongolia	167.8 cm (5 ft 6 in)	156.8 cm (5 ft 1 1/2 in)	1.07	15–64 (N= m:2,656 f:3,117)	Measured	2015	
Morocco	171.8 cm (5 ft 7 1/2 in)	159.2 cm (5 ft 2 1/2 in)	1.08	18+ (N= m:1,871 f:3,390)	Measured	2017	
Mozambique	—N/a	156 cm (5 ft 1 1/2 in)	—N/a	25–49 (N= f:6,912, SD= f:6.2 cm (2.4 in))	Self-reported	2003	
Myanmar	163.5 cm (5 ft 4 1/2 in)	153.4 cm (5 ft 1/2 in)	1.07	25–64 (N= m:2,948 f:5,447)	Measured	2014	
Namibia	—N/a	160.7 cm (5 ft 3 1/2 in)	—N/a	25–49 (N= f:5,575, SD= f:7.1 cm (2.8 in))	Self-reported	2006	
Nauru	168.1 cm (5 ft 6 in)	156.6 cm (5 ft 1 1/2 in)	1.07	15–64 (N= m:1,083 f:1,186)	Measured	2004	
Nepal	161.7 cm (5 ft 3 1/2 in)	150.4 cm (4 ft 11 in)	1.08	15–69 (N= m:1,326 f:2,798)	Measured	2012–2013	
Nepal	163 cm (5 ft 4 in)	150.8 cm (4 ft 11 1/2 in)	1.08	25–49 (N= f:6,280, SD= f:5.5 cm (2.2 in))	Self-reported	2006	
Nicaragua	—N/a	153.7 cm (5 ft 1/2 in)	—N/a	25–49	Self-reported	2001	
Nicaragua – Managua	166.8 cm (5 ft 5 1/2 in)	154.7 cm (5 ft 1 in)	1.08	20+ (N= m:1,024 f:969)	Measured	2010	
Niger	173 cm (5 ft 8 in)	164 cm (5 ft 4 1/2 in)	1.05	15–64 (N= m:1,464 f:1,316)	Measured	2007	
Nigeria	174.8 cm (5 ft 9 in)	—N/a	—N/a	18–40 (N= m:1500, 500 each from the three major ethnicities)	Measured	2024	
Oman	167.4 cm (5 ft 6 in)	156.1 cm (5 ft 1 1/2 in)	1.07	18+ (N= m:3,338 f:2,955)	Measured	2017	
Pakistan — Punjab and Sindh provinces	165.8 cm (5 ft 5 1/2 in)	153.9 cm (5 ft 1/2 in)	1.08	18–69 (N= m/f:6,613)	Measured	2013–2014	
Papua New Guinea	161.7 cm (5 ft 3 1/2 in)	154.3 cm (5 ft 1/2 in)	1.05	15–64 (N= m:1,408 f:1,451)	Measured	2007–2008	
Peru	164 cm (5 ft 4 1/2 in)	151 cm (4 ft 11 1/2 in)	1.09	20+	Measured	2005	
Philippines	163.5 cm (5 ft 4 1/2 in)	151.8 cm (5 ft 0 in)	1.08	20–39	Measured	2003	
Poland	172.2 cm (5 ft 8 in)	159.4 cm (5 ft 3 in)	1.08	44–69 (N= m:4,336 f:4,559)	Measured	2007	
Portugal	171 cm (5 ft 7 1/2 in)	161 cm (5 ft 3 1/2 in)	1.06	20–50	Self-reported	2001	
Qatar	171.2 cm (5 ft 7 1/2 in)	157.7 cm (5 ft 2 in)	1.09	18–64 (N= m:1,038 f:1,423)	Measured	2012	
Rwanda	163.9 cm (5 ft 4 1/2 in)	155.7 cm (5 ft 1 1/2 in)	1.05	15–64 (N= m:2,649 f:4,467)	Measured	2012–2013	
Saudi Arabia	167.1 cm (5 ft 6 in)	154.3 cm (5 ft 1/2 in)	1.08	15–64 (N= m:2,244 f:2,345)	Measured	2005	
Senegal	—N/a	163 cm (5 ft 4 in)	—N/a	25–49 (N= f:2,533, SD= f:6.7 cm (2.6 in))	Self-reported	2005	
Sierra Leone	166 cm (5 ft 5 1/2 in)	158 cm (5 ft 2 in)	1.05	25–64 (N= m:1,996 f:2,311)	Measured	2009	
Solomon Islands	166.4 cm (5 ft 5 1/2 in)	155.7 cm (5 ft 1 1/2 in)	1.07	25–64 (N= m:688 f:1018)	Measured	2006	
Spain	—N/a	159.6 cm (5 ft 3 in)	—N/a	18–70 (N= f:8,217)	Measured	2007–2008	
Sri Lanka	165.4 cm (5 ft 5 in)	152.9 cm (5 ft 0 in)	1.08	18–69 (N= m:1,866 f:2,899)	Measured	2015	
Sudan	171.2 cm (5 ft 7 1/2 in)	160.3 cm (5 ft 3 in)	1.07	18–69 (N= m:2,662 f:4,548)	Measured	2016	
Switzerland	175.4 cm (5 ft 9 in)	164 cm (5 ft 4 1/2 in)	1.07	20–74	Self-reported	1987–1994	
Tajikistan	167.7 cm (5 ft 6 in)	156.7 cm (5 ft 1 1/2 in)	1.07	18–69 (N= m:1,094 f:1,557)	Measured	2017	
Tanzania	—N/a	156.6 cm (5 ft 1 1/2 in)	—N/a	25–49 (N= f:6,033, SD= f:6.5 cm (2.6 in))	Self-reported	2004	
Thailand	170.3 cm (5 ft 7 in)	159 cm (5 ft 2 1/2 in)	1.07	STOU students, 15–19 (N= m:839 f:1,636, SD= m:6.3 cm (2.5 in) f:5.9 cm (2.3 in))	Self-reported	2005	
Togo	169.1 cm (5 ft 6 1/2 in)	159.3 cm (5 ft 2 1/2 in)	1.06	15–64 (N= m:2,064 f:2,249)	Measured	2010	
Trinidad and Tobago	173.2 cm (5 ft 8 in)	160.6 cm (5 ft 3 in)	1.08	15–64 (N= m:1,112 f:1,608)	Measured	2011	
Turkmenistan	173.3 cm (5 ft 8 in)	162.7 cm (5 ft 4 in)	1.07	18–69 (N= m:1,713 f:2,237)	Measured	2018	
Uganda	168.0 cm (5 ft 6 in)	159.4 cm (5 ft 3 in)	1.05	18–69 (N= m:1,425 f:2,062)	Measured	2023	
Ukraine	175.8 cm (5 ft 9 in)	164.6 cm (5 ft 5 in)	1.07	18–69 (N= m:1,648 f:2,761)	Measured	2019	
United Arab Emirates	173.4 cm (5 ft 8 1/2 in)	156.4 cm (5 ft 1 1/2 in)	1.11	—N/a	—N/a	—N/a	
United States	175.3 cm (5 ft 9 in)	161.3 cm (5 ft 3 1/2 in)	1.09	All Americans, 20+ (N= m:5,092 f:5,510)	Measured	2015–2018	
United States – Non-Hispanic Whites	176.7 cm (5 ft 9 1/2 in)	162.4 cm (5 ft 4 in)	1.09	Non-Hispanic white, 20+ (N= m:1,782 f:1,779)	Measured	2015–2018	
United States – Hispanic and Latino Americans	170.4 cm (5 ft 7 in)	157.5 cm (5 ft 2 in)	1.08	Hispanic, 20+ (N= m:1,292 f:1,536)	Measured	2015–2018	
United States – African Americans	176 cm (5 ft 9 1/2 in)	162.5 cm (5 ft 4 in)	1.08	Non-Hispanic black, 20+ (N= m:1,107 f:1,255)	Measured	2015–2018	
United States – Asian Americans	170.5 cm (5 ft 7 in)	156.3 cm (5 ft 1 1/2 in)	1.09	Non-Hispanic Asian, 20+ (N= m:1,107 f:1,255)	Measured	2015–2018	
Uruguay	170 cm (5 ft 7 in)	158 cm (5 ft 2 in)	1.08	Adults (N= m:2,249 f:2,114)	Measured	1990	
Uzbekistan	170.1 cm (5 ft 7 in)	160.2 cm (5 ft 3 in)	1.06	18–69 (N= m:1,462 f:2,224)	Measured	2019	
Vanuatu	167.8 cm (5 ft 6 in)	158.7 cm (5 ft 2 1/2 in)	1.06	25–64 (N= m:2,257 f:2,244)	Measured	2011–2012	
Vietnam	164.0 cm (5 ft 4 1/2 in)	153.4 cm (5 ft 1/2 in)	1.07	18–69 (N= m:1,837 f:1,884)	Measured	2021	
Zambia	—N/a	158.5 cm (5 ft 2 1/2 in)	—N/a	25–49 (N= f:4,091, SD= f:6.5 cm (2.6 in))	Self-reported	2007	
Zimbabwe	—N/a	160.3 cm (5 ft 3 in)	—N/a	25–49 (N= f:4,746, SD= f:6.2 cm (2.4 in))	Self-reported	2005	
