= Charley Lineweaver =

Astronomer

Charley Lineweaver is an astronomer specializing in the fields of exoplanetology and cosmobiology who, as of 2025, is a researcher at the Australian National University.

Lineweaver completed his undergraduate studies in history and physics from the State University of New York at Binghamton and LMU Munich, respectively, and earned a PhD in physics from the University of California, Berkeley, where he was supervised by George Smoot. He also has a master of arts degree in English from Brown University.

He is a senior fellow of the Planetary Science Institute.
