= List of alumni of the Geneva Graduate Institute =

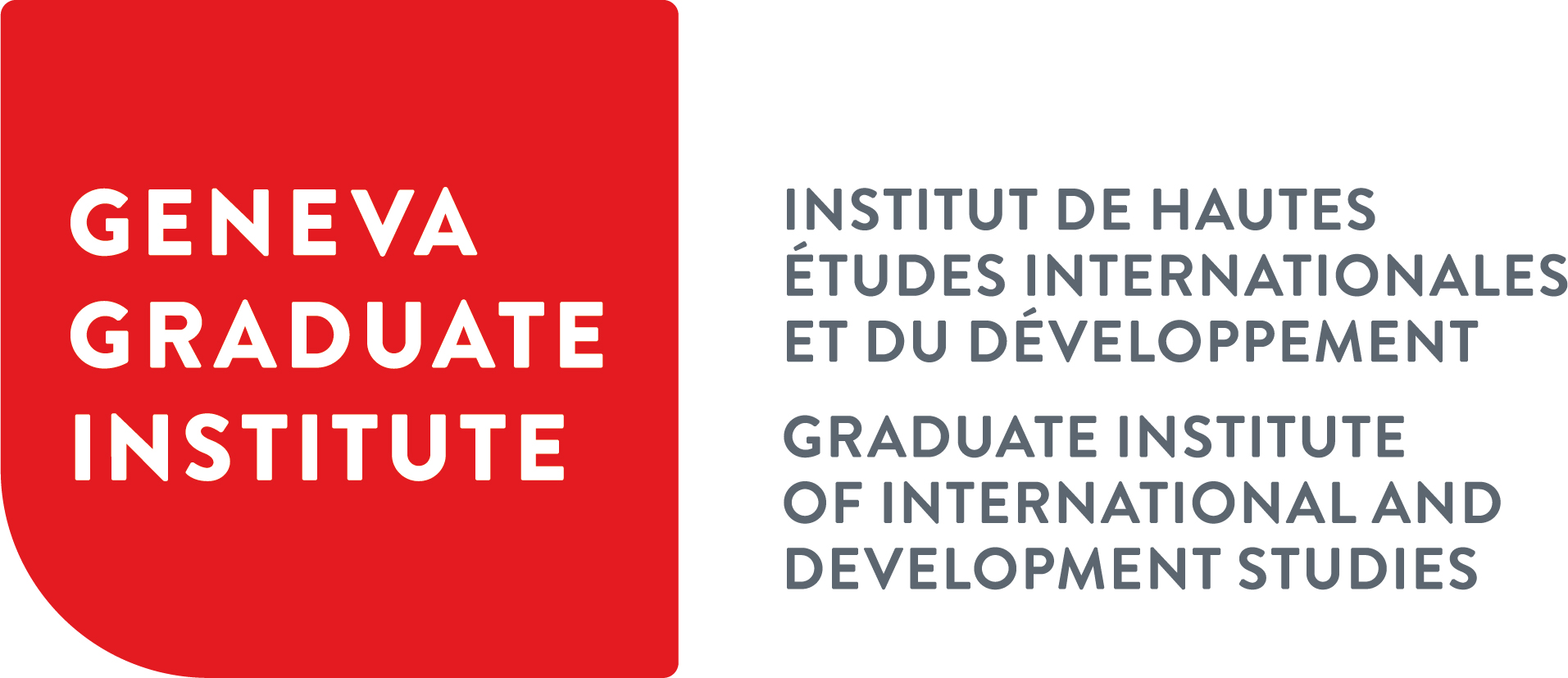

This is a list of notable alumni of the Graduate Institute of International and Development Studies (French: Institut de hautes études internationales et du développement, abbreviated IHEID or the Graduate Institute Geneva), a bilingual postgraduate university located in Geneva, Switzerland. Prominent alumni include three Nobel laureates, seven heads of state, a Pulitzer Prize winner, one Secretary-General of the United Nations, and various senior figures at the UN and other international organisations, as well as many academics specialising in international economics, international history, international law, international relations, development studies, political science and anthropology. Some of the most prominent alumni's stories are featured in the Institute's "Hall of Inspiring Stories," an audio-visual collection of biographies that has been prepared to celebrate the Institute's centenarian in 2027.

== Nobel laureates ==
- Kofi Annan (DEA 1962), former secretary-general of the United Nations and 2001 Nobel Peace Prize winner
- Mohamed ElBaradei (DEA 1964), Egyptian jurist and diplomat, former director general of the International Atomic Energy Agency, 1997–2009, and 2005 Nobel Peace Prize winner
- Leonid Hurwicz (1940), Polish-American economist and mathematician, 2007 winner of the Nobel Memorial Prize in Economics

== Law, politics and government ==
=== Heads of state and government ===
- Nazim al-Qudsi (1927), former president of Syria, 1961–1963
- Micheline Calmy-Rey (Licence 1968), former president of Switzerland
- Kurt Furgler (1948), former president of Switzerland
- Jafar Hassan (PhD 2000), prime minister of Jordan
- Kamil Idris (PhD 1984), prime minister of Sudan
- Michel Kafando (1972), interim president of Burkina Faso, 2014–2015
- Jakaya Mrisho Kikwete, fourth president of Tanzania
- Alpha Oumar Konaré, former president of Mali, 1992–2002; chairperson of the African Union Commission, 2003–2008
- Henri, Grand Duke of Luxembourg (1980)
- Boy Rozendal (1957), prime minister of the Netherlands Antilles, 1971–1975

=== Ministers ===
- Delia Albert, secretary of foreign affairs of the Philippines
- Youssouf Bakayoko (Certificate 1971), foreign affairs minister of Côte d'Ivoire
- Elvis Mutiri Wa Bashara (fr) (1998), minister of tourism of the Democratic Republic of the Congo and member of the National Assembly (Democratic Republic of the Congo)
- Achille Bassilekin III, (fr), minister of small and medium-sized enterprises, social economy and crafts of Cameroon
- Benjamin Bounkoulou, minister of foreign affairs of the Republic of Congo
- Jean-Victor Harvel Jean-Baptiste (DEA 1990), minister of foreign and religious affairs of Haiti
- Sibusiso Bengu (PhD 1974), minister of education of South Africa; first black vice-chancellor of a South African university (Fort Hare University)
- István Bibó (PhD 1935), minister of state of Hungary
- Martin Coiteux (PhD 1991), Quebec's minister of public safety, municipalities and responsible for Montreal
- Patricia Espinosa (DEA 1987), secretary of foreign affairs of Mexico and executive secretary of the United Nations Framework Convention on Climate Change
- Abul Fateh (Fellow 1962–1963), first foreign minister of Bangladesh
- Baba Gana Kingibe (did not graduate), minister of foreign affairs, minister of internal affairs, minister of power and steel of Niger and Secretary to the Government of the Federation
- He Yafei (DEA 1987), vice-minister of the Ministry of Foreign Affairs of China
- Manouchehr Ganji (PhD 1962), education minister of Iran and human rights activist
- Ana Gervasi, minister of foreign affairs of Peru
- Bonaya Godana (PhD 1984), foreign minister of Kenya, 1998–2001
- Parker T. Hart (Certificate 1936), former United States Assistant Secretary of State for Near Eastern and South Asian Affairs
- Annemarie Huber-Hotz (1975), federal chancellor of Switzerland, 2000–2007
- Sandra Kalniete (1995), minister of foreign affairs of Latvia, 2002–2004, Member of the European Parliament
- Manuel Tello Macías, secretary of foreign affairs of Mexico
- Paul Martin Sr., foreign minister of Canada, 1963–1968
- Tshiunza Mbiye (DEA 1967), minister of economy of the Democratic Republic of the Congo
- Teodor Meleșcanu (PhD 1973), minister of foreign affairs of Romania, director of the Foreign Intelligence Service and former minister of defense
- Ram Niwas Mirdha, cabinet minister in India
- Kamel Morjane (DEA 1976), defense minister and foreign minister of Tunisia, 2005–2011
- Marie-Ange Lukiana Mufwankolo, minister of gender, women and children and minister of labor for the Democratic Republic of Congo
- Saïd Ben Mustapha (1961), foreign minister of Tunisia, 1997–1999
- Kristiina Ojuland (1992), foreign minister of Estonia and member of the European Parliament
- Andrzej Olechowski, minister of finance and minister of foreign affairs of Poland
- Marco Piccinini, minister of finance and economy of Monaco
- Francisco Rivadeneira (1995), minister of foreign commerce of Ecuador
- Shri Shumsher K. Sheriff, Secretary General of the Rajya Sabha of India
- Albert Tévoédjrè, minister of information of Benin
- Ernst Theilen (de), state secretary at the Ministry of the Interior and Sport of the German state of Rhineland-Palatinate
- Tôn Thất Thiện (PhD 1963), cabinet minister and public intellectual in Vietnam
- Omar Touray (DEA 1992, PhD 1995), former secretary of foreign affairs of the Gambia
- Joseph Tsang Mang Kin (1968), minister of arts and culture of Mauritius; poet
- Raph Uwechue (DEA 1964), minister of health of Nigeria
- Gheorghe Vlădescu-Răcoasa (PhD 1928), minister of minority nationalities of Romania
- Henry Tumukunde (MA 2013), minister of security of Uganda

=== Public officials ===
- Marco Aguiriano (Licence), secretary of state for the European Union
- Shara L. Aranoff (Fulbright 1984–1985), chairman of the U.S. International Trade Commission
- T. H. Bagley (PhD 1950), high-level CIA counterintelligence officer
- Hendrik Cornelis (1933), Governor-General of the Belgian Congo
- Íñigo Salvador Crespo (DES 1994), state attorney general of Ecuador
- Patricia Danzi (CAS 2001), director general of the Swiss Agency for Development and Cooperation
- Jack Fahy, United States government official and suspected spy during World War II
- Vivek Joshi (MA, PhD), Election Commissioner of India
- Mary Dublin Keyserling, United States economist who faced loyalty allegations during the Red Scare
- Thorsten V. Kalijarvi, United States Assistant Secretary of State for Economic and Business Affairs
- Signe Krogstrup (PhD 2003), governor at the Central Bank of Denmark
- Annemarie Huber-Hotz, former Federal Chancellor of Switzerland
- Carlos Lopes (MA), High representative of the Commission of the African Union, former United Nations under secretary-general and executive secretary of the Economic Commission for Africa
- Andréa Maechler (DEA 1994), deputy general manager of the Bank for International Settlements, Swiss National Bank's first female board member
- Robert McFarlane (Licence), United States National Security Advisor, 1983–1985
- Isabel Rochat (fr) (licence 1981), member of the Council of State of Geneva
- Alexandre Roig (es), president of Argentina's Instituto Nacional de Asociativismo y Economía Social
- Jean-Pierre Roth (PhD 1975), former chairman of the Swiss National Bank
- André Simonazzi (Licence 1992), vice-chancellor of the Swiss Federal Council
- Robert-Jan Smits, director-general for research at the European Commission
- William L. Stearman (MA, PhD 1960), United States government official, aviator and author
- Jean-Luc Vez, head of Switzerland's Federal Office of Police
- René-Jean Wilhelm (PhD 1983), co-author of the Geneva Conventions
- Vinay Mohan Kwatra, foreign secretary of India
- James M. Wilson Jr. (1939), United States assistant secretary of state for human rights and humanitarian affairs, 1975–1977
- Marcelo Zabalaga (DEA 1977), ex-president of the Central Bank of Bolivia

=== Judges ===
- Georges Abi-Saab (PhD 1967), judge at the International Court of Justice and the International Criminal Tribunal for Rwanda
- Ann Aldrich (1951), United States federal judge
- Julio A. Barberis (1964), judge at the Inter-American Court of Human Rights
- Marc Bossuyt (PhD 1975), president of the Constitutional Court (Belgium)
- María Teresa Infante Caffi (PhD 1979), judge at the International Tribunal for the Law of the Sea
- Pablo Sandonato de León (MIS 2008, PhD 2013), judge at the Administrative Tribunal of the Organization of American States
- Maurice Kamga (DEA 1997, PhD 2003), judge at the International Tribunal for the Law of the Sea
- Giorgio Malinverni (PhD 1965), judge at the European Court of Human Rights
- Erik Møse, former president of the International Criminal Tribunal for Rwanda, 2003–2007
- Fatsah Ouguergouz (PhD 1991), judge at the African Court on Human and Peoples' Rights
- Andreas Paulus (1991), judge at the Federal Constitutional Court of Germany
- Christos Rozakis (visiting scholar 1985–1986), president of the Administrative Tribunal of the Council of Europe
- Íñigo Salvador Crespo (DES 1994) chief magistrate of the Court of Justice of the Andean Community
- Max Sørensen (PhD 1946), former judge at the European Court of Justice, 1973–1979, and at the European Court of Human Rights, 1980–1981
- Nina Vajić (DEA), judge at the European Court of Human Rights
- Robert Yorke Hedges (DEA 1927), Chief Judge of Sabah and Sarawak in Malaysia
- Abdulqawi Yusuf (PhD 1980), ex-president of the International Court of Justice

=== Elected officials and politicians ===
- Antony Alcock (PhD 1968), Northern Ireland politician
- Michael D. Barnes (DEA 1966), United States Congressman, 1979–1987
- Eliyahu Ben-Elissar (PhD 1969), member of Israel's Knesset and ambassador
- Tarcísio Burity (PhD), former governor of Paraíba, Brazil
- Marie Barbey-Chappuis (licence 2004), mayor of Geneva
- Damien Cottier, member of the Swiss National Council
- Jan Christiaanse, member of the Senate of The Netherlands
- Fernand Corbat, member of the Swiss National Council
- Jacques-Simon Eggly, member of the Swiss National Council
- Théodore de Félice (fr), member of the Grand Council of Geneva
- Enrico Franzoni (licence), member of the Swiss National Council
- Kurt Furgler, member of the Swiss Federal Council
- Molly Gray (LLM 2016), Vermont's 82nd lieutenant governor
- Antonio Hodgers (licence 1999, DEA 2003), Swiss politician
- Hans Lindqvist (licence 1972), member of the European Parliament
- François Lumumba, Congolese politician, leader of a faction of the Mouvement National Congolais-Lumumba
- Mauricio Mulder (DEA 1985), member of Peru's Congress
- Jacques Myard (PhD), member of the National Assembly of France
- Alexandra Perina-Werz (de), former member of the Grand Council of Bern
- Hans-Gert Pöttering (PhD), former president of the European Parliament, 2007–2009
- Meta Ramsay, Baroness Ramsay of Cartvale, former British intelligence officer and member of Britain's House of Lords
- Emrys Roberts, president of the British Liberal Party, 1963–1964
- Wilson dos Santos (1972), representative of the National Union for the Total Independence of Angola to Portugal
- Yukari Sato, member of Japan's National Diet
- Saki Scheck, member of the first parliament of the second republic of Ghana
- Henri Schmitt (1949), member of the Swiss National Council and member of the European Parliament
- Veiko Spolītis (DEA 2003), member of the parliament of Latvia
- Carlo Sommaruga (1985), member of the Council of States (Switzerland)
- Alexandra Thein, German politician and member of the European Parliament
- Egidijus Vareikis (lt), member of the Seimas of the Republic of Lithuania
- Robert F. Wagner Jr., mayor of New York City
- Béatrice Wertli (fr) (Licence), secretary-general of the Christian Democratic People's Party of Switzerland
- Arlette Zakarian (executive MA), state spokeswoman for Austria expatriates members of the political party NEOS

=== Diplomacy ===
- Márcia Donner Abreu (DEA), ambassador of Brazil, Secretary for Bilateral Negotiations in Asia, the Pacific and Russia
- Livia Leu Agosti, chief negotiator of Switzerland for European Union talks and former ambassador to Iran and France
- Adnan Atassi (fr) (1927), ambassador of Syria in France
- John A. Baker Jr., United States diplomat, Director of the Bureau of Refugee Programs
- William M. Bellamy (certificate), United States ambassador to Kenya
- Asher Ben-Natan (1953), Israeli ambassador to Germany and France
- Wilfried Bolewski (de) (DEA 1972), ambassador of Germany to Jamaica
- Nadia Burger (de) (PhD 1996), ambassador of Canada to Indonesia and Timor-Leste
- Linus von Castelmur (1992) (de), ambassador of Switzerland to the Democratic Republic of Congo, India and South Korea
- Chanan Cidor (de), Israeli ambassador
- Violet Conolly (1932), authority on Soviet Russia at the British Foreign Office
- Arlette Conzemius (DEA), Swiss permanent representative to NATO
- Jean-Jacques de Dardel (DEA, PhD 1980), Swiss ambassador to China
- Shelby Cullom Davis (PhD 1934), US ambassador to Switzerland, 1969–1975; philanthropist
- Kwami Christophe Dikenou (de) (1978), Togo's ambassador to Germany
- Patrick Eyers (1954), Britain's ambassador to the German Democratic Republic
- Elyes Ghariani (de), Tunisia's ambassador to Germany
- Andreas Guibeb, Namibia's ambassador to Germany
- Niels Hansen (Diplomat) (license 1951, PhD 1955), German ambassador to Israel and to NATO
- Vagn Hoffmeyer Hoelgaard (1938), Danish ambassador
- Claude Heller (DEA), ambassador of Mexico to the United Nations
- Véronique Hulmann (de), Swiss ambassador to Kyrgyzstan and Macedonia
- Klaus-Peter Klaiber (1967), EU special representative to Afghanistan and German ambassador to Australia
- Tamara Kunanayakam (DEA 1982), ambassador of Sri Lanka to the United Nations Office in Geneva
- Egriselda López (MA 2018), Permanent representative of El Salvador to the United Nations in New York
- Maira Mariela Macdonal Alvarez, Bolivian diplomat and one of the Vice-Presidents of the United Nations Human Rights Council
- Hermann Meyer-Lindenberg (PhD 1935), ambassador of Germany to Spain, and ambassador to Italy
- A.H.M. Moniruzzaman (certificate 1989), ambassador of Bangladesh to Belgium, Switzerland, and Luxembourg
- Mathias Mossberg (sv), ambassador of Sweden to Tunisia
- Anne Namakau Mutelo, ambassador of Namibia to Ethiopia
- Robert G. Neumann (1937), American ambassador and politician
- François Nordmann (DEA 1972), Swiss ambassador to France
- Jean-François Paroz, Swiss ambassador to Hungary
- Ana Cândida Perez (1992), Brazilian ambassador to Nigeria
- Christian Prosl (de), Austrian ambassador to Germany and the United States
- Egidio Reale (1929), Italian ambassador to Switzerland
- Andrea Reichlin (de), Swiss ambassador to Jordan and Malaysia
- Michael Reiterer (1985), ambassador of the European Commission to Switzerland and professor of international politics at Vrije Universiteit Brussel
- Oswaldo de Rivero, permanent representative of Peru to the United Nations in New York
- Patricia Elaine Joan Rodgers (1981), Bahamian diplomat
- Alfredo Rogerio Pérez Bravo (enrolled), Mexican ambassador to Algeria, Panama, Malaysia, Russia, Portugal, and New Zealand
- Illa Salifou (de), Niger ambassador to the United States
- Andrea Rauber Saxer (de), deputy head of the Permanent Swiss Mission to the OSCE
- Pierre-Yves Simonin (fr), ambassador of Malta to the United Nations Office in Geneva
- Mohamed Shaker (PhD 1976), Egyptian ambassador
- Alvaro de Soto (DEA 1980), ambassador of Peru to France
- Zalman Shoval (DEA 1952), former Israeli ambassador to the US
- Luis Solari Tudela, ambassador of Peru to the United Kingdom
- Mohamed Ibrahim Shaker (PhD 1975), Egyptian ambassador
- Jenö Staehelin, first Swiss Permanent Representative to the United Nations in New York
- Godert Willem de Vos van Steenwijk (nl), ambassador of the Netherlands to Hungary, Indonesia, Canada and Moscow
- Johan Swinnen (1973), Belgian ambassador to Rwanda during the Rwandan genocide
- Hugo Tamm (1932), Swedish ambassador to Israel and South Africa
- Emanuel Treu (1945), Austrian ambassador to the United Nations in Geneva and resistance leader during World War Two
- Eduardo Ponce Vivanco (1984), Peruvian ambassador
- Christian Wenaweser, ambassador of Liechtenstein to the United Nations
- Claude Wild (licence), Swiss ambassador to Ukraine
- Rodrigo Alberto Carazo Zeledón (PhD 1997), ambassador of Costa Rica to the United Nations and ex-member of the Legislative Assembly of Costa Rica

=== Military ===
- Lennart Bengtsson (sv), brigadier general in the Swedish military
- Frederic J. Brown III (MA, 1963, PhD 1967), U.S. Army lieutenant general
- Stefan Kristiansson (1996), Swedish Army officer
- Bengt Liljestrand (1968), Swedish Army officer, chief of staff of the United Nations Truce Supervision Organization and commander of the Second United Nations Emergency Force

=== United Nations and international organisations ===
- Arnauld Antoine Akodjènou (PhD 1988), head of the United Nations Multidimensional Integrated Stabilization Mission in Mali
- Catarina de Albuquerque, U.N. Special Rapporteur on the human right to safe drinking water and sanitation
- Hédi Annabi, former Special Representative of the United Nations Secretary-General for Haiti
- Anthony Banbury (DEA 1993), United Nations Assistant Secretary-General for Field Support, Deputy Ebola Coordinator and Operation Crisis Manager
- Marcel André Boisard (PhD 1977), Under-Secretary General to the United Nations and former executive director of United Nations Institute for Training and Research
- Arthur E. Dewey, former Assistant U.N. Secretary-General
- Edvard Hambro (PhD 1936), 25th President of the United Nations General Assembly, 1970–1971
- Arthur Dunkel, director-general of General Agreement on Tariffs and Trade (GATT), 1980–1993
- Marcus Fleming, former deputy director of the research department of the International Monetary Fund
- Giorgio Giacomelli, commissioner-general of the United Nations Relief and Works Agency for Palestine Refugees in the Near East
- Rafael Grossi (PhD 1997), director-general of the International Atomic Energy Agency
- Kamil Idris (PhD 1984), director-general of the World Intellectual Property Organization, 1997–2008
- Kaarina Immonen, U.N. official
- C. Wilfred Jenks, director-general of the International Labour Organization, 1970–1973
- Alexandre Kafka, executive director at the International Monetary Fund
- Jakob Kellenberger (1974–1975), president of the International Committee of the Red Cross, 2000–2012
- Pierre Krähenbühl (licence), Commissioner-General of the United Nations Relief and Works Agency for Palestine Refugees in the Near East
- Olivier Long (PhD 1943), director-general of the General Agreement on Tariffs and Trade, 1968–1980
- Carlos Lopes (DEA), U.N. under secretary-general and executive secretary of the United Nations Economic Commission for Africa
- Jonathan Lucas (PhD 1998), head of the International Narcotics Control Board
- Tatiana Molcean, Moldovan diplomat and executive secretary of the United Nations Economic Commission for Europe
- Jacques Moreillon (PhD 1971), former director-general of the International Committee of the Red Cross
- Martha Ama Akyaa Pobee (diploma 1993), assistant secretary-general of the United Nations for Africa
- Bastiaan Quast (PhD 2016), Dutch-Swiss data scientist at the International Telecommunication Union, known for AI for Good and ITU-WHO Focus Group on Artificial Intelligence for Health
- Arnold Rørholt (jurist) (1934), Norwegian jurist and refugee worker
- Cornelio Sommaruga (DEA 1961), former president of the International Committee of the Red Cross
- Christian Strohal (1976), former director of the Organization for Security and Cooperation in Europe's Office for Democratic Institutions and Human Rights
- Eric Suy (nl), U.N. under secretary-general for legal affairs and director-general of the European Office of the United Nations in Geneva
- Mervat Tallawy, Egyptian politician, former U.N. under-secretary and executive secretary of the United Nations Economic and Social Commission for Western Asia
- Sérgio Vieira de Mello, former United Nations High Commissioner for Human Rights
- Clément Nyaletsossi Voule, Togolese jurist, United Nations Special Rapporteur on the Rights to Freedom of Peaceful Assembly and of Association

== Nobility ==
- Duarte Pio, Duke of Braganza and pretender to the throne of Portugal
- Princess Nora of Liechtenstein
- Maria Teresa, Grand Duchess of Luxembourg (PhD 1989)

== Business ==
- Paul Appermont, Belgian businessman
- Sasha Bezuhanova, Bulgarian businesswoman
- Larry Carp (1949), attorney-at-law
- Ralph D. Crosby Jr. (DEA 1976), chairman and CEO of Airbus Group, Inc. (formerly EADS North America), 2002–2009
- Kathryn Wasserman Davis (PhD 1934), American investor and philanthropist
- Vitalii Demianiuk, Ukrainian engineer, entrepreneur, public figure and philanthropist
- Jean-Marc Duvoisin (DEA 1985), CEO of Nespresso
- Lynn Forester de Rothschild (Fellow 1978–1979), CEO of E.L. Rothschild
- Nobuyuki Idei (did not graduate), founder and CEO of Quantum Leaps Corporation; chairman and Group CEO of Sony Corporation, 1999–2005
- Rick Gilmore (PhD 1971), president and CEO of the GIC Group and Council on Foreign Relations scholar
- Philipp Hildebrand (DEA 1990), vice-president of BlackRock, former president of the Swiss National Bank
- Léon Lambert (licence 1950), Belgian banker and art collector
- Yan Lan (PhD 1991), vice chairman of investment banking/chairman and CEO of Greater China at Lazard
- Yves Mirabaud (Licence), former Senior Managing Partner at Mirabaud Group
- Birahima Nacoulma (fr), president of the Conseil National du Patronat Burkinabé
- Mary Mangigian Tarzian, businesswoman, philanthropist and publisher
- Vera Michalski (1978), Swiss publisher
- Naneen Neubohn, former executive at Morgan Stanley
- Horst Rogusch (de) (PhD; did not graduate), German entrepreneur and philanthropist
- Brad Smith (DEA 1984), president and chief legal officer of Microsoft
- Arno Spitz (de), German publisher
- G. Richard Thoman, American businessman and former president and CEO of Xerox Corporation
- Carl Zimmerer (de), founder and CEO of InterFinanz

== Non-profit organizations and activism ==
- Krishna Ahooja-Patel (PhD 1974), Indian trade unionist and women's rights activist
- Svein Andresen (PhD 1987) (no), secretary-general of the Financial Stability Board
- Umberto Campagnolo (PhD 1937) (it), Italian professor of political philosophy and prominent antifascist activist
- Julius E. Coles (exchange student), former president of Africare
- René Cruse (fr), French public intellectual, peace activist and writer
- Julia Duchrow (de), secretary general of the German section of Amnesty International
- Obiora Ike (de) (DEA 1983), Roman Catholic cleric and human rights activist
- Edward Kossoy (PhD 1975), Polish lawyer and activist for victims of Nazism
- Malek K. Gabr (PhD 1969), Egyptian scouting leader
- Vita Matīss (lv), first executive director of the Soros Foundation – Latvia
- Franz Muheim (de) (1968), president of the Swiss Red Cross
- László Nagy, Secretary General of the World Organization of the Scout Movement
- Beatrice Pitney Lamb, editor and writer with the League of Women Voters
- Berhane Ras-Work, Ethiopian anti-female genital mutilation activist
- Egidio Reale (1929), Italian anti-fascist and diplomat
- Gerhart M. Riegner (1937), secretary-general of the World Jewish Congress, 1965–1983; in 1942, he sent the so-called Riegner Telegram
- Hernando de Soto (DEA 1967), Peruvian economist and president of the Institute for Liberty and Democracy
- Jean-Claude Vignoli (MA 2005), co-founder of UPR Info
- Kanitha Wichiencharoen (1949), Thai lawyer and women's rights advocate
- Theodor H. Winkler (Licence 1977, PhD 1981), director of the Geneva Centre for the Democratic Control of Armed Forces
- Gerhard Winterberger, director of the Swiss Federation of Commerce and Industry
- Philip Yang (1994) (br), Brazilian entrepreneur and urban activist
- Thierry Zomahoun (DEA), chairman and CEO of the Niagara Forum

== Media ==
- Joaquín Mbomío Bacheng (es), journalist and author
- Frédéric Bastien (MIS 1997, PhD 2002), Canadian author and historian
- Robert Albert Bauer (1931), anti-Nazi radio broadcaster with Voice of America
- James Becket, documentary filmmaker
- Vicken Cheterian, Lebanese journalist
- Virgilio Dagnino (it) (1927), Italian writer, journalist, banker and politician
- Ariane Dayer (fr), Swiss journalist
- Madeleine Zabriskie Doty (PhD 1945), American journalist and pacifist
- Alexis Favre (fr), Swiss news anchor
- Jean-Pierre Péroncel-Hugoz (fr), French journalist and essayist
- Eric Hoesli (fr), Swiss journalist
- Beat Kappeler (de) (PhD 1970), Swiss journalist
- Helen Kirkpatrick (DEA), American war correspondent during the Second World War
- Esther Mamarbachi (fr) (DEA 1992), Swiss broadcast journalist
- Maurine Mercier (fr, Swiss broadcast journalist
- Malika Nedir (fr) (DEA), Swiss news anchor
- Cholpon Orozobekova, prominent Kyrgyz journalist
- Jean-Pierre Péroncel-Hugoz (fr) (PhD 1974), French journalist and essayist
- Claudio Risé (it), Italian journalist
- Nicolas Rossier (1995), American filmmaker and reporter
- Pierre Ruetschi (fr) (Licence '83), Swiss journalist
- Arnold Sagalyn, American journalist
- Vincent Verzat (fr), web videographer
- Jon Woronoff (Licence 1965), American writer and East Asian specialist

== Fine arts ==
- Muqbil Al-Zahawi, Iraqi ceramist
- Marthe Fare, Togolese writer
- Carlos Fuentes (1950), Mexican novelist, essayist and diplomat
- Kantarama Gahigiri, filmmaker
- José Jara (es), Spanish filmmaker
- Catherine Lovey (fr), Swiss novelist
- Selim Matar, Iraqi novelist and sociologist
- Derek B. Miller (DES 1998, PhD 2004), American novelist
- Karim Sayad (fr), Swiss-Algerian filmmaker
- Kaar Kaas Sonn (fr) (DEA 2003), French songwriter and author
- Fiona Ziegler (MA), Swiss filmmaker

== Academia ==
=== Economics ===
- Pontus Braunerhjelm (PhD 1994), professor of economics at the Royal Institute of Technology
- Hugh C. Brooks (DEA 1948), economic geographer at St. John's University (New York City)
- Martin Coiteux (PhD 1991), professor of economics and international business at HEC Montreal
- Victoria Curzon-Price (PhD 1974), professor of economics at the University of Geneva and former director of the Mont Pelerin Society
- Paul Dembinski (licence 1978, certificate 1980), economics professor at the University of Geneva specialized on finance and ethics
- Paul Demeny (1957), economist who pioneered the concept of Demeny voting
- Rüdiger Dornbusch (Licence 1966), international economics professor at MIT
- Helen Hoang (2010), economist and author
- Asher Hobson (PhD 1931), leading U.S. agricultural economist, professor at the University of Wisconsin-Madison
- Harry Gideonse (1928), economist, second president of Brooklyn College and Chancellor of the New School for Social Research
- Lewis Webster Jones, president of the University of Arkansas, 1947–1951; president of Rutgers University, 1951–1958
- Karl William Kapp (PhD 1936), founding father of ecological economics, professor of economics at the City University of New York and at the University of Basel
- William Lazonick (1975), professor of economics at the University of Massachusetts Lowell
- Gianmarco Ottaviano (DEA 1994), professor of economics at the London School of Economics and Political Science and at Bocconi University
- Dina Pomeranz (licence 2002, MIS 2004), professor of applied economics at the University of Zurich

=== History ===
- Philippe Burrin (PhD 1985), professor of history at the Geneva Graduate Institute specializing in the history of fascism and of the Shoah
- Ernst Engelberg, professor at Leipzig University and historian of Otto von Bismarck
- Saul Friedländer (PhD 1963), professor at UCLA, historian of Germany and Jewish history, winner of the 2008 Pulitzer Prize for General Nonfiction
- Piero Gleijeses (PhD 1972), historian of U.S. foreign relations, professor at the Johns Hopkins University School of Advanced International Studies
- Robert A. Graham (PhD 1952), church historian and authority on papal diplomacy
- Peter Hruby (PhD 1978), historian of central and eastern Europe, professor at Charles University
- Arno J. Mayer, historian of modern Europe, diplomatic history and the Holocaust, professor at Princeton University
- Gerhard Menk (summer school 1969), German historian and professor at the University of Giessen
- Waldemar Michowicz (pl), historian of Polish diplomacy, professor at the University of Łódź
- Boris Mouravieff (PhD 1951), Russian historian of esoteric philosophy, professor at the University of Geneva
- André Reszler (fr) (Licence 1958, PhD 1966), scholar of the history of ideas, professor at the University of Geneva
- Davide Rodogno (PhD 2001), historian of humanitarianism and fascism, professor at the Geneva Graduate Institute
- Ivan L. Rudnytsky (PhD 1951), historian of Ukrainian socio-political thought, professor at the American University
- Jayita Sarkar (PhD 2014), historian of nuclear infrastructures, capitalism, and empires, professor at the University of Glasgow
- Clarence C. Walton (post-doctoral fellow 1952), professor of history at Columbia University and president of the Catholic University of America

=== International law ===
- Georges Abi-Saab (PhD 1967), professor of international law at the Graduate Institute of International and Development Studies
- Jean Allain (PhD 2000), professor of international law at Monash University
- Michael Bothe (DEA 1966), professor of public law, Johann Wolfgang Goethe-Universität Frankfurt
- Laurence Boisson de Chazournes (PhD 1991), professor of international law at the University of Geneva and at the Collège de France
- Cleopatra Doumbia-Henry (PhD 1984), president of the World Maritime University
- Willem Thomas Eijsbouts (DEA 1971), professor of European law at Leiden University
- Marcelo Kohen (PhD 1995), professor of international law at the Geneva Graduate Institute, secretary-general of the Institut de Droit International
- Andreas Kulick (de), professor of international law at the University of Mainz
- Giorgio Malinverni (PhD 1974), professor of law of the University of Geneva, judge at the European Court of Human Rights
- Krystyna Marek (PhD 1954), professor of international law at the Graduate Institute of International and Development Studies
- Andreas Paulus (1991), professor of international law of the University of Göttingen
- Steven R. Ratner (DEA 1993), Bruno Simma Collegiate Professor of Law and director, University of Michigan Donia Human Rights Center
- Cesare P.R. Romano (PhD 1999), professor of international law at Loyola Law School Los Angeles
- Evelyne Schmid (de) (licence 2007), professor of international law at the University of Lausanne
- Ricardo Seitenfus (de) (PhD 1980), professor of law at the Federal University of Santa Maria
- Frederick Sherwood Dunn (1927), professor of international law at Yale University
- Chris Thomale (de), professor of international law at the University of Vienna
- Jiří Toman (PhD 1981), expert in the field of international law, professor at Santa Clara University School of Law
- Jorge E. Viñuales (Licence 2002, DEA 2004), professor of law and environmental policy at the University of Cambridge
- Wolfgang Alschner (PhD), Hyman Soloway Chair in Business and Trade Law, Associate Professor, Common Law Section, Faculty of Law, University of Ottawa.
- Han-Wei Liu (PhD), Associate Professor of Law, Singapore Management University.
- Jason Rudall(PhD), Assistant Professor of Law, Leiden University.
- Tibisay Morgandi (PhD), Associate Professor of Law, Queen Mary, University of London.
- Barry Sander (PhD), Assistant Professor of Law, Leiden University
- Ka Lok Yip (PhD), Assistant Professor of Law, Hamad Bin Khalifa University.
- Xuexia Liao (PhD), Assistant Professor of Law, Peking University

=== International relations and political science ===
- Mahdi Ahouie (PhD 2008), professor of international relations at the University of Tehran
- Jonathan Luke Austin (PhD 2017), British political sociologist at University of Copenhagen
- Lars-Erik Cederman (MA 90), professor of international conflict research at ETH Zurich
- Andrew W. Cordier (1930–1931), former president of Columbia University, 1968–1970
- Wolfgang F. Danspeckgruber (PhD 1994), political scientist at Princeton University, expert on self-determination
- Marwa Daoudy (PhD 2003), professor of international relations specialized in the Middle East at Georgetown University
- André Donneur (PhD 1967), political science professor at the Université du Québec à Montréal
- Manfred Elsig (post-graduate work 2009), professor of international relations at the World Trade Institute of the University of Bern
- Ossip K. Flechtheim (1939), professor of political science at the Free University of Berlin
- Daniel Frei (de) (post-graduate work), professor of political science at the University of Zurich
- Basil Germond (PhD), professor of international security at Lancaster University
- John Groom (de) (PhD 1971), professor of international relations at the University of Kent
- Sieglinde Gstöhl (PhD 1988), professor of international relations at the College of Europe
- Marcelo Gullo (es) (MA), professor of international relations at the Universidad Nacional de Lanús
- Jeffrey Harrod (PhD 1972), professor of political economy at Erasmus University Rotterdam known for his work on the power of corporations
- Thierry Hentsch (PhD 1967), professor of political philosophy at the Université du Québec à Montréal
- John H. Herz (DEA 1938), professor of international relations at the City College of New York
- Shireen Hunter (PhD 1983), Iran scholar and research professor at Georgetown University, scholar on Iran
- Dimitri Kitsikis (1962), Turkologist and professor of international relations at the University of Ottawa
- Albert Legault (PhD 1964), professor at the Université du Québec à Montréal specialized in peacekeeping and nuclear deterrence
- Heinrich Liepmann (1932), German-British political economist
- Carlos Lopes (MA), professor of public governance at the University of Cape Town
- Urs Luterbacher (PhD 1974), political science professor at the Geneva Graduate Institute specializing in game theory
- Zidane Meriboute (fr) (PhD 1983), SOAS scholar specializing in Islam
- Kristen Monroe (junior year), professor at the University of California, Irvine specialized in political psychology and ethics
- Hans Joachim Morgenthau (post-graduate work 1932), leading political scientist of international relations and professor at the University of Chicago
- Gordon Mace (fr), professor of political science at Université Laval
- Karlheinz Niclauß (de), professor of political science at the University of Bonn
- Carla Norrlöf (PhD 2002), professor of political science at the University of Toronto
- Kazem Rajavi (PhD 1975), Iranian professor of political science at the University of Geneva and an advocate of human rights, assassinated by the Iranian government on 24 April 1990
- Philippe Regnier (PhD 1986), professor of international development at the University of Ottawa
- Gilbert Rist (PhD 1978), professor of development studies at the Geneva Graduate Institute, critic of international development
- Edmundo Hernández-Vela Salgado (PhD 1970), emeritus professor of international relations at the National Autonomous University of Mexico
- Philippe C. Schmitter (Licence 1961), professor of political science at the European University Institute, Stanford University and the University of Chicago
- Jürgen Schwarz (de), professor of political science at the University of the Bundeswehr Munich
- Pierre de Senarclens (PhD 1973), professor of international relations at the University of Lausanne
- Hsueh Shou Sheng (Licence, PhD 1953), vice-chancellor of Nanyang University in Singapore, 1972–1975 and founding rector of the University of Macau
- Merze Tate (summer school), professor, scholar and expert on United States diplomacy at Howard University
- Peter Uvin (PhD 1991), professor of political science at Claremont McKenna College and at the Fletcher School of Law and Diplomacy at Tufts University
- Egidijus Vareikis (lt), professor of political science at Vilnius University
- Graham Walker (academic) (DEA), second president of Patrick Henry College
- Jessica L.P. Weeks (MA 2003), professor of political science at the University of Wisconsin-Madison
- Zhang Weiwei (professor) (PhD 1994), professor of international relations at Fudan University
- Patricia A. Weitsman (pre- and post-doctorate fellow), professor of political science at Ohio University
- Thomas G. Weiss (1971–1972), presidential professor at the Graduate Center of the City University of New York, international relations scholar recognized as an authority on the United Nations system
- Francis O. Wilcox (PhD 1935), former dean of the Johns Hopkins University Paul H. Nitze School of Advanced International Studies

=== Environmental studies ===
- Jacques Grinevald (1970), professor of global ecology at the Geneva Graduate Institute
- Laure Waridel (PhD 2016), professor of environmental studies at the Université du Québec à Montréal

=== Anthropology ===
- George W. Grace (Licence 1948), American ethnolinguist and anthropologist, professor at University of Hawaiʻi

== Other ==
- Imran N. Hosein, Islamic preacher, author and philosopher
- Jacques Piccard (1948), deep-sea explorer and inventor
