= Ana Cândida Perez =

Brazilian diplomat (born 1953)

Ana Cândida Perez (born 1 March 1953 in Porto Alegre, Rio Grande do Sul, Brazil) is a retired Brazilian diplomat. She was the Consul-General in Shanghai (2012-2017) and the Brazilian ambassador in Abuja (2009-2012).

== Biography ==
=== Training ===
In 1975, Perez graduated from the Pontifical Catholic University of Rio de Janeiro with a degree in Portuguese and literature. In 1977, she obtained a master's in comparative literature from the University of Montreal. In 1992, she enrolled in a master's program in international relations at the Graduate Institute of International Studies, but did not graduate.

=== Diplomatic career ===
Perez joined the diplomatic service in 1980 and held various posts abroad, including in Paris, Caracas, Stockholm and London.

In 2009, she became the Brazilian ambassador in Abuja, where she remained until 2012. She represented Brazil at the Economic Community of West African States, where Brazil is a permanent observer. In 2010, she was promoted to first-class minister, the highest rank in the hierarchy of the Brazilian diplomatic service. Subsequently, she assumed the role of Consul-General in Shanghai from 2012 to 2017.

== Decorations ==
Perez was awarded the Tamandaré Merit Medal of Brazil in 1983, and she was made Commander of Sweden's Order of the Polar Star in 2002.
