= Marwa Daoudy =

Swiss academic

Marwa Daoudy is a Swiss associate professor of international relations at the Edmund A. Walsh School of Foreign Service at Georgetown University where she holds the Seif Ghobash Chair in Arab Studies. She was previously a lecturer at Oxford University and the Graduate Institute of International Studies in Geneva. She has been a researcher at the Center for International Studies and Research (CNRS and Sciences Po) and has written various articles on water sharing, conflict and negotiations in the Middle East.

She holds a doctorate from the Graduate Institute of International Studies in Geneva.

Her second book, "The Origins of the Syrian Conflict: Climate Change and Human Security", won the Harold and Margaret Sprout Award of the International Studies Association for the best book in environmental studies. Her first book, "Le partage des eaux entre la Syrie, l'Irak et la Turquie : négociation, sécurité et asymétrie des pouvoirs", meanwhile won the Ernest Lémonon Award of the Académie des Sciences Morales et Politiques

Daoudy is of Palestinian descent.

== Books ==
- "Le partage des eaux entre la Syrie, l'Irak et la Turquie : négociation, sécurité et asymétrie des pouvoirs" (CNRS éditions).
- "The Origins of the Syrian Conflict: Climate Change and Human Security" (Cambridge University Press)
