= Arnauld Antoine Akodjènou =

United Nations' official

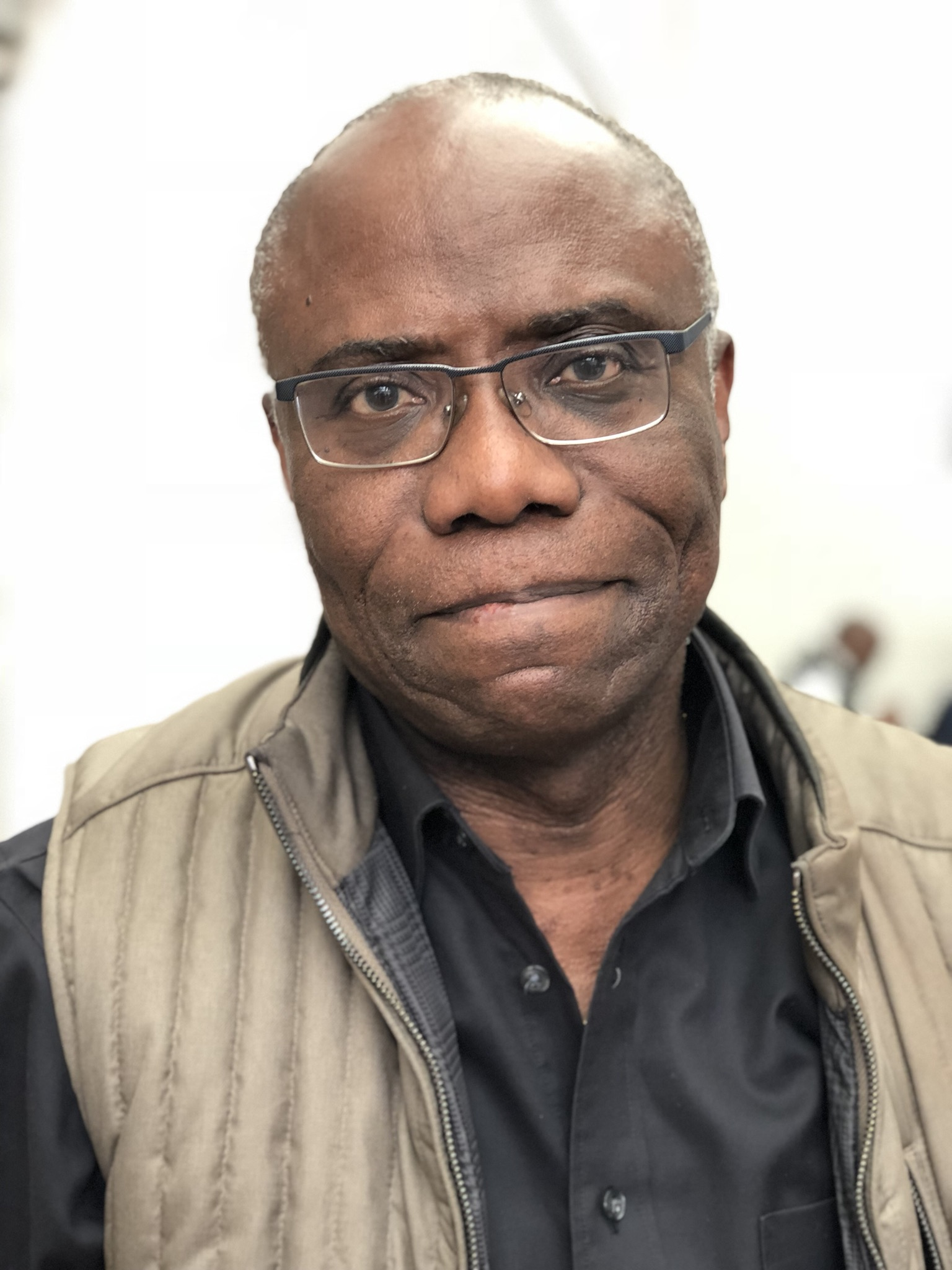

Special Adviser for Africa at the Kofi Annan Foundation
- Incumbent
- Assumed office September 2019

Regional Refugee Coordinator and Special Advisor to the High Commissioner for the South Sudan refugee situation (UNHCR)
- In office June 2017 – August 2019

Arnauld Antoine Akodjènou (born in 1950), a native of Benin, is a long-life humanitarian and diplomat, currently serving as Senior Adviser for Africa at the Kofi Annan Foundation specifically working on the Democracy and Electoral Integrity Initiative. Prior to this he served as the Regional Refugee Coordinator and Special Adviser to the High Commissioner for refugees for the South Sudan Situation at the United Nations High Commissioner for Refugees (UNHCR). He has held numerous positions in the United Nations Department of Peace Operations, in Côte d'Ivoire (ONUCI) and Mali (MINUSMA), and as a Deputy Special Representative of UN Secretary General. His career with the UNHCR spans over twenty-five years.

Akodjènou is widely credited for creating enabling policies and agreements that saw the return of more than two million refugees back to Sierra Leone between 2000 - 2003. Further to this, he oversaw the return of over a hundred thousand refugees from Algeria, Burkina Faso, Niger and Mauritania back to their homes in Mali. He was at the helm during the peak of the Great Lakes emergency operations in the mid-nineties, as well as those of Cote D'Ivoire and Liberia in the early 2000s, making him one of Africa's most prominent humanitarians.

== Education ==
Akodjènou earned a Bachelor of Arts in history at the University of Bénin in 1974. He also attended the Institute of International Relations of Cameroon in Yaoundé, from which he received a Postgraduate diploma in International Relations in 1976. His Master's thesis focused on an analysis of Algeria's foreign and national policy. In 1978, he joined the Graduate Institute of International and Development Studies (formerly known as Institut des Hautes Études Internationales) in Geneva where he received a PhD in political science in 1982. His dissertation analyzed the then need for technical cooperation between "the International Telecommunication Union (ITU) and African countries".

== Career ==
Akodjènou began his career at the United Nations High Commission for Refugees (UNHCR) in 1986. As a young professional, he served in different contexts in Djibouti, the Democratic Republic of Congo, Cameroon, the Central African Republic, the Republic of Congo and Chad.

From 1991 to 1996, he headed different geographic areas of operations at headquarters including in eastern Zaire focusing on the Great Lakes refugee crisis (1993–1996). From 1997 to 2003 he was UNHCR representative in Mali, then in Sierra Leone and from Ghana, in Accra, assumed the Regional Coordinator functions for Liberia and Côte d'Ivoire crisis. During that period he managed humanitarian activities to strengthen coordination and cooperation with other UN agencies, local governments, NGOs and civil society, to find solutions to crises, to improve living conditions of refugees and ensure their safe and voluntary return to their home countries. From 2003 to 2005 he served as Director of Emergency and Security Services at Headquarters, and Director of all operational services – emergency and security, resource allocation, supply, technical services, programme management for all UNHCR operations worldwide; both postings were located at UNHCR Headquarters in Geneva.

With this experience, Akodjènou assumed the role and responsibilities of Inspector General of UNHCR in Geneva from 2009 to 2011where he supported the High Commissioner with independent assurance and oversight of UNHCR's activities and operations.

In June 2011, he was appointed by Secretary General Ban Ki-moon as Deputy Special Representative for Côte d'Ivoire for the United Nations Secretary-General (United Nations Operations in Côte d'Ivoire, ONUCI). Based in Abidjan, he was in charge of political affairs and the rule of law pillar, working a variety of portfolios including electoral assistance, security sector reform and the promotion of political dialogue.

Following this, he was appointed Deputy Special Representative in the United Nations Multidimensional Integrated Stabilization Mission in Mali (MINUSMA) from 2014 to 2015. Akodjènou led the United Nations Mediation Team in Algiers (August 2014-January 2015), which resulted in the May 2015 Peace Agreement. He supported the implementation of political and institutional reforms provided by the Agreement, as well as defense, security, reconciliation and justice measures.

Between October 2015 and June 2017, Akodjènou was a Special Advisor for Africa at the Kofi Annan Foundation, responsible for the Electoral Integrity Initiative in Cameroon and the Democratic Republic of the Congo to address, with all stakeholders, election-related political challenges with the aim of improving electoral integrity.

In June 2017, he was appointed Regional Refugee Coordinator and Special Advisor to the High Commissioner for the South Sudan Situation by the United Nations High Commissioner, Mr Filippo Grandi. In this capacity, he worked closely with UNHCR operations in South Sudan, the Central African Republic, the Democratic Republic of the Congo, Ethiopia, Kenya, Sudan and Uganda to ensure a strong overarching vision and coherent engagement across the region in pursuit of protection and solutions for South Sudanese IDPs and refugees. From this office, he promoted effective refugee participation in peace and national reconciliation processes and advocated for additional resources and visibility for the regional response.

Since September 2019, upon completion of his mission related to the South Sudan situation, Akodjènou returned to the Kofi Annan Foundation where he has been working since October 2015 as Senior Adviser for Africa on the Democracy and Electoral Integrity Initiative, with a specific focus on electoral process in Africa.

== Publications ==
1. Une union africaine face au jihadisme, 12 March 2020, Jeune Afrique
2. Un humain sur 113 est déplacé ou réfugié : il est temps d'agir, 17 July 2016, Jeune Afrique

== Personal life ==
Akodjènou is married and has three children.
