= Jean-François Paroz =

Swiss diplomat, ambassador

Jean-François Paroz (French pronunciation: [ʒɑ̃fʁɑ̃swa paʁo]; born in 1960) is a Swiss diplomat and an ambassador from Moutier, Canton of Bern. Since December 2020 he is the Swiss Ambassador to Hungary.

== Biography ==
After obtaining a master's degree in French, history, and philosophy at the University of Lausanne, he acquired a postgraduate degree in international relations at the Graduate Institute of International Studies in Geneva.

In 1988, Paroz entered the Federal Department of Foreign Affairs (FDFA). After finishing internships in foreign countries and working in the FDFA head office, he became an advisor to Boutros Boutros-Ghali, Secretary-General of the Organisation Internationale de la Francophonie. From 2007 to 2009, he was the Swiss ambassador to Senegal, Mali, Mauritania, Cape Verde, the Gambia and Guinea-Bissau located in Dakar. During this time, Swiss nationals were kidnapped in Mali and the Swiss embassy had to take care of their release.

In 2010, he was the commissioner for the organization of the XIIIth summit of the Francophonie in Montreux, an event that brought together over 40 heads of state and government, and represented a major logistical challenge. He was also the commissioner of the 31st conference of the Red Cross and Red Crescent in 2011.

In 2012, Paroz was appointed as the ambassador to Hungary, and presented his letter of credence to President János Áder on 5 November of the same year. In November 2015, during the tenure as the ambassador to Hungary, he was appointed as the next ambassador to Japan.

On 20 September 2016, Paroz presented his letter of credence at the Imperial Palace in Tokyo and officially assumed the position of Ambassador to Japan. After completing his mission in Japan, he was reappointed as Switzerland's ambassador to Hungary and presented his credentials to President János Áder on 2 December 2020.

Paroz is married and father of 3 children.

Public position
Predecessor: Livio Hürzerler	(Switzerland) Swiss Ambassador to Senegal 2007–2009	Successor: Charles-Edouard Held
Predecessor: Christian Mühlethaler	(Switzerland) Swiss Ambassador to Hungary 2012–2016	Successor: Peter Burkhard
