= André Donneur =

- Born: November 24, 1938 (age 87); Geneva
- Education: Doctorate at Graduate Institute of International Studies
- Awards: Queen Elizabeth II Diamond Jubilee Medal

André Donneur (born November 24, 1938, Geneva) has been a professor at the Université du Québec à Montréal (UQAM), Canada since 1969 after having taught at Laurentian University, from 1966 to 1969. He was a founding member of the department of political science of UQAM. He holds a doctorate from the Graduate Institute of International Studies.

He was a member of the board of directors of Association francophone pour le savoir (1968-1970), president of the Canadian Political Science Association (1970-1972), guest member of the policy analysis committee of Global Affairs Canada (1972- 1973), director of the political science department at UQAM (1974-1976), president of the Social Sciences and Humanities Research Council of Canada (1976-1977) and was a member (1985-1991) of the executive committee of the International Political Science Association and (1986-1992) of the advisory committee of the International Journal of Political Science. In 1983 and 1989 he was part of the Canadian delegation to the United Nations General Assembly and that to the Geneva conference on disarmament in 1984, as well as a participant in the Ottawa conference which created the Ottawa treaty (1997).

He has published or collaborated on dozens of books on Canadian foreign policy, transnational forces and comparative regional security. He received in 1977 the Queen Elizabeth II Diamond Jubilee Medal for his scientific contribution.

== Selected work ==
- Histoire de l’Union des partis socialistes pour l’action internationale (1920-1923). Sudbury Ontario: Libr. de l’Université Laurentienne, 1967.
- L'Internationale socialiste, Paris, Presses universitaires de France, 1983
- Canada and the enlargement of NATO, dans The future of NATO, éd. par C.P. David et J. Lévesque, Montréal-Kingston, McGill Queen's University Press, 1999 (with M. Bourgeois)
- Le Canada, les États-Unis et le monde, La marge de manœuvre canadienne, Les Presses de l'Université Laval, 2005
