= Fiona Ziegler =

Swiss filmmaker

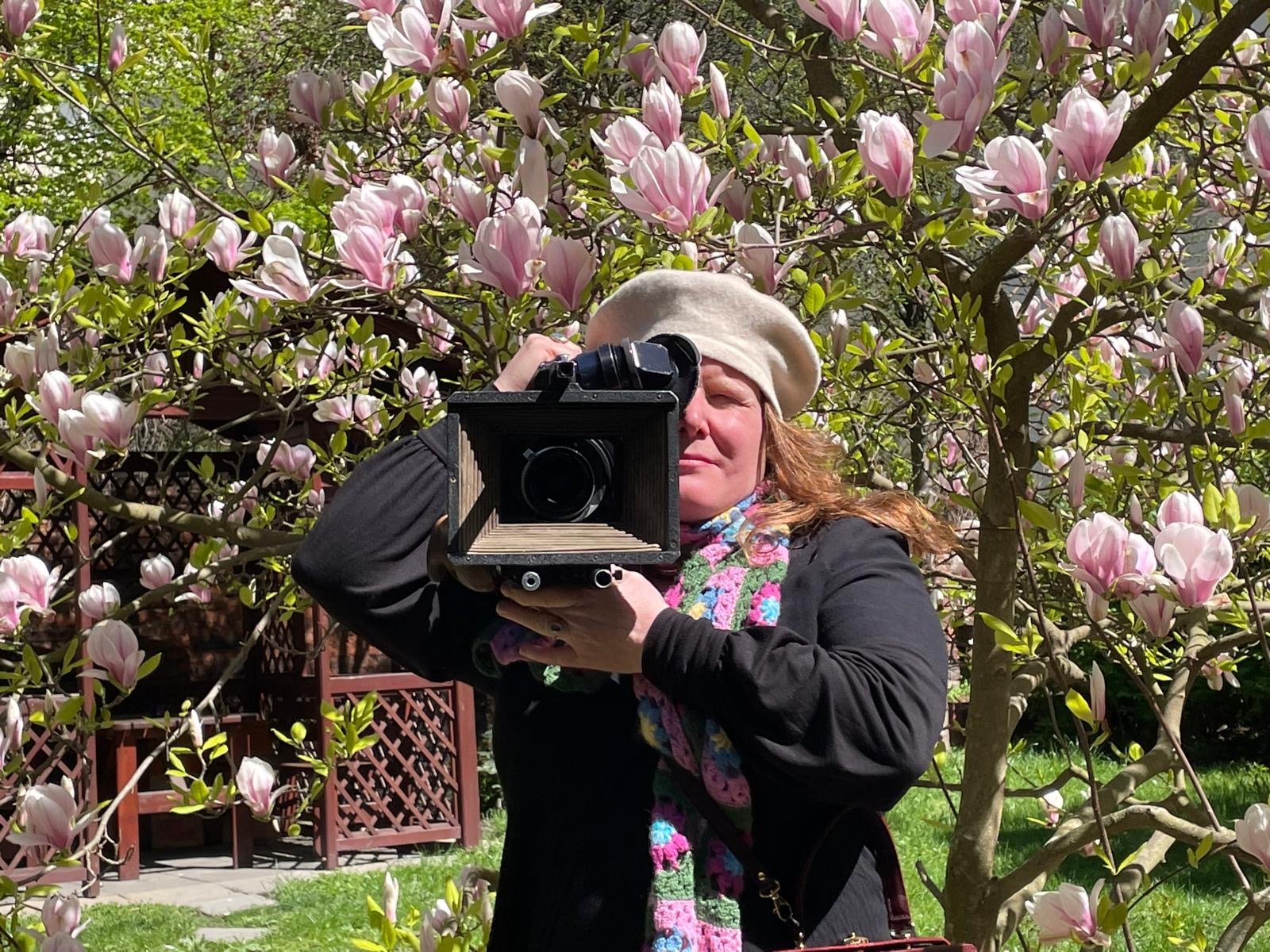
Fiona Ziegler, Swiss film director

Fiona Ziegler (born 1983) is a Swiss film director and screenwriter.

== Biography ==
Fiona Ziegler was born in 1983 in Basel, Switzerland. She grew up in Basel and Bern. She studied literature, history and international politics at the University of Fribourg, University of Bologna and Geneva, where she graduated with a Master degree in International History and Politics at the Graduate Institute IHEID. She received in 2020 a Bachelor's and Master's degrees in screenwriting and film-directing at Film and TV School of the Academy of Performing Arts in Prague.

Her feature film debut Lost in Paradise premiered at the Prague International Film Festival in 2021 and was nominated for the Prix du Public at the Solothurner Film Festival in Switzerland. Fiona’s short films Home (2013), 2:1 (2013), God Particle (2015) and Thank You Ben (2016) all screened internationally.

== Filmography ==
- Lost in Paradise (director and screenplay writer), 2021 fiction feature, Swiss-German & Czech, Catpics (CH) / Cinémotiffilms (CZ). Selected at Prague International Film Festival, Solothurner Filmtage, Award: Premio del Pubblico 2022, CinÉst Fest, Catania (IT). Streamer: Netflix CZ & SK, Apple TV.
- A Second Life / Druhý Život, 2018, documentary, exhibited in Prague, Brno, Plzeň, Zlín, Bratislava and Zurich.
- Toda Raba Ben / Thank You Ben, 2016, short fiction, Awards: Best Film Delhi Shorts International Film Festival, Best Editing International Mumbai Shorts Festival.
- Božská částice / God Particle, 2015, short fiction, Awards: Chinese Student Film Festival Hong Kong (CHN).
