= Pontus Braunerhjelm =

Swedish economist (born 1953)

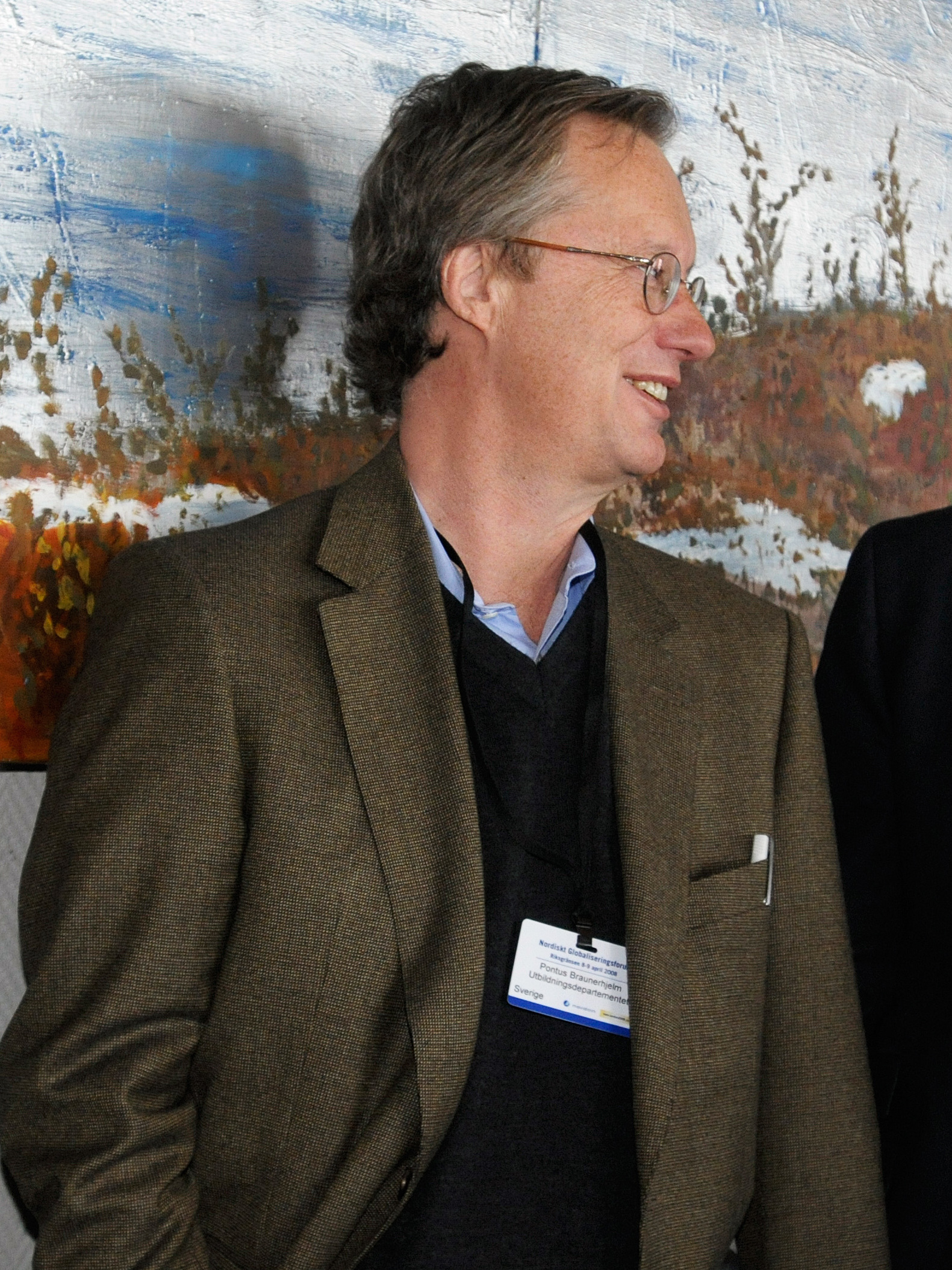
Pontus Braunerhjelm from the Swedish Ministry of Education at the globalization meeting in Riksgränsen 2008-04-08

Pontus Braunerhjelm (born 1953) is a Swedish economist who works as a professor at KTH Royal Institute of Technology, where he was head of the Department of Industrial Economics and Management (2012–2016). He has previously been Secretary General of the Swedish government Globalization Council, and until 2014, the CEO of the Swedish Entrepreneurship Forum.

== Biography ==
Braunerhjelm received his doctorate in international economics from the Graduate Institute of International Studies in Geneva in 1994, and also a doctorate from the Jönköping International Business School, in 1999, on knowledge capital, firm performance and network production.

Braunerhjelm was elected in 2009 as a member of the Royal Swedish Academy of Engineering Sciences.

On April 3, 2014, Braunerhjelm was appointed by the Swedish government chairman of the Entrepreneurship Committee with the task of reviewing corporate taxes and the conditions for starting, operating, developing and owning companies in Sweden.

His scientific publications have, according to Google Scholar, an h-index of 34.

== Bibliography (selected) ==
- 2001 – Eliasson Gunnar, Braunerhjelm Pontus, red. Huvudkontoren flyttar ut: om de svenska huvudkontorens betydelse för tillväxt och välstånd (1. uppl.). Stockholm: SNS förl. Libris länk. ISBN 9171508260
- 2004 – Braunerhjelm Pontus, Skogh Göran, red. Sista fracken inga fickor har: filantropi och ekonomisk tillväxt (1. uppl.). Stockholm: SNS förl. Libris länk. ISBN 9171509399
- 2006 – Andersson, Thomas; Braunerhjelm Pontus, Jakobsson Ulf. Det svenska miraklet i repris?: om den tredje industriella revolutionen, globaliseringen och tillväxten (1. uppl.). Stockholm: SNS förlag. Libris länk. ISBN 9185355518
- 2008 – (på engelska) Entrepreneurship, knowledge, and economic growth. Foundations and trends in entrepreneurship, 1551-3114; 2008:5. Boston: Now Publishers. Libris länk. ISBN 9781601981240
- 2012 – Braunerhjelm, Pontus; Eklund Klas, Henrekson Magnus. Ett ramverk för innovationspolitiken: hur göra Sverige mer entreprenöriellt?. Stockholm: Samhällsförlaget. Libris länk. ISBN 9789197943284
- 2013 – Braunerhjelm Pontus, red. Institutioner och incitament för innovation: entreprenöriella vägval för svensk tillväxt. Swedish Economic Forum report; 2013. Stockholm: Entreprenörskapsforum. Libris länk
- 2016 – Braunerhjelm Pontus, Larsson Johan P., Thulin Per, Skoogberg Ylva, red (på engelska). The entrepreneurial challenge: a comparative study of entrepreneurial dynamics in China, Europe and the US. Örebro: Swedish Entrepreneurship Forum. Libris länk. ISBN 9789189301832

== Awards ==
Eklund Johan, Norlin Pernilla, red (2018). Festskrift till Pontus Braunerhjelm. [Örebro]: Entreprenörskapsforum. Libris länk. ISBN 9789189301986 - festskrift till Braunerhjelms 65-årsdag.
