= Krishna Ahooja-Patel =

Indian trade unionist and activist (1929–2018)

- Born: March 15, 1929; Amritsar, British Raj
- Died: December 27, 2018 (aged 89) near Ottawa, Canada
- Citizenship: India
- Occupation(s): Trade unionist, women's rights activist, journalist

Krishna Ahooja-Patel (March 15, 1929 in Amritsar, India – December 27, 2018 near Ottawa, Canada) was an Indian trade unionist, women's rights activist, journalist, and pacifist who worked in various organizations such as the United Nations (UN).

== Life ==
Krishna Ahooja-Patel was born in 1929 as the eldest of five siblings, in the North Indian Amritsar. The family believed in Sikhism and Hinduism. Her mother stayed home and her father was a progressive businessman. In 1942, the family moved to Bombay (now Mumbai) where, as a 13-year-old student, Krishna heard a speech by Mahatma Gandhi whose ideas deeply impressed her. She earned a Bachelor of Arts degree in Political Science from the University of Aligarh (U.P.), India, and a PhD from the Graduate Institute of International Studies in Geneva.

From 1947 to 1962, Ahooja-Patel lived in the UK, where she studied law and worked for the BBC. She married an Indian journalist who also worked for the BBC and later divorced her. From 1962 to 1987, she worked for the International Labor Organization (ILO), a specialized agency of the United Nations, for which she initially worked as a legal adviser in Ethiopia and later moved to Geneva. In 1974, she represented the ILO at a conference on women and education in Cambridge and was then responsible for the interests of female workers at the ILO. From 1977 to 1987 she published the magazine Women's Network.

In the 1990s, Ahooja-Patel was Deputy Director of the International Research and Training Institute for the Advancement of Women (INSTRAW) in the Dominican Republic and President of the Women's World Summit. In 1995, she traveled to Beijing with a Peace Movement organized by the Women's International League for Peace and Freedom (WILPF) for the Fourth UN World Conference on Women and joined WILPF.

Starting in 2000, Ahooja-Patel and the WILPF worked to translate UN Security Council Resolution 1325 into as many languages as possible to spread it around the world, thereby increasing the pressure on the UN to actually implement the resolution. The resolution emphasizes the important role of women in preventing and resolving conflicts and peace processes. Other central topics of the WILPF are peace education, women's rights, disarmament, and the strengthening of the UN. In 2001, Ahooja-Patel became the first non-white president of WILPF. She devoted herself to this task until 2004.

In 2002, she witnessed the riots between Hindus and Muslims in Gujarat state, where more than 1,000 people were killed. In 2003, she organized a seminar for peace and reconciliation between Hindus and Muslims. Together with her second husband, she headed the Institute for Economic Justice and Development at Gujarat University in Ahmedabad, India. In December 2004 she was elected President of the NGO Committee on the Status of Women in Geneva, an umbrella organization belonging to the more than 35 international NGOs. IN 2005, Ahooja-Patel was nominated for the Nobel Peace Prize for the Nobel Peace Prize in the framework of the project 1000 Women.

On December 27, 2018, Krishna Ahooja-Patel died after a brief illness in a retirement home near Ottawa, Canada, where she had spent the last few years of her life.

== Quote ==
Krishna Ahooja-Patel is considered the author of the quote:

"Women are half of the world's population, do two-thirds of the work, get one-tenth of the income, and are the owners of one per cent of the property."

== Literature ==
- 1000 PeaceWomen Across the Globe, Contrast Publishing, 2005.
