= Robert Albert Bauer =

American radio broadcaster

Robert Albert Bauer (Austrian born, US citizen, 1910 – September 27, 2003), was a US Foreign Service Officer, an anti-Nazi radio broadcaster, Voice of America (VOA) announcer, and an international affairs author and editor. His diplomatic career spanned from World War II to the Cold War. He fled from the Nazis three times – from Vienna and Prague in 1938 and from Paris in 1940.

== Radio broadcaster ==
A master of Austrian slang dialects, Bauer anonymously broadcast anti-Nazi news stories in German through the Austrian Freedom Broadcasting Station in Fecamp, Normandy, in the 1930s. He often imitated Adolf Hitler and mocked him in comical news stories. The press called him "Rudolph.2" He was active in the Austrian anti-Nazi movement against Hitler before World War II. In 1980, he was awarded the Great Silver Order of Honor from the Republic of Austria for Service in the Liberation of Austria.

== Education ==
Bauer graduated from the Graduate Institute of International Studies in Geneva, Switzerland in 1931. He took an M.A. from the College of Economic Sciences in Vienna in 1932; a Doctor Juris degree from University of Vienna Law School in 1933; a diploma in Middle-East Studies from the University of Tehran in 1960; and a master's degree in Middle East Studies from American University in Cairo, Egypt in 1967. He was fluent in German, French and English.

== Early life ==
Bauer was born in Vienna in 1910, the son and only child of Robert Bauer and Rosa Schwarz. His father was an officer in the Imperial and Royal Austro-Hungarian Army and was killed in the final days of World War I, when Bauer was eight years old. That early loss dramatically shaped Bauer's life.

Upon graduating with a doctor of law in 1933, Bauer practiced in Vienna from 1935 to 1938. As a student at Vienna University, he became a member of the social-democratic youth movement. After the assassination of Austrian chancellor Engelbert Dollfuss by the Nazis in 1934, Bauer became convinced that the only way to fight the Nazis was within the framework of the "Vaterländische Front" (Patriotic Front), the only political organization allowed in Austria at that time. Bauer joined its propaganda office as a volunteer and spoke at international youth conferences in Prague and Paris in 1937.

== World War II ==
His broadcasting came to Hitler's attention, who placed Bauer on the Nazis' Most Wanted list. On the same day that the Nazis occupied Austria during the Anschluss on March 12, 1938, Bauer boarded a train with one suitcase and left Austria. He never saw his mother again. He fled to Czechoslovakia and joined the Free Austria Movement in Prague, where he worked as a New York Times reporter from 1938 to 1939, covering the Sudetenland and Carpatho-Ukraine regions.

While in Prague, he met Maria von Kahler, (b. 1920) who worried that she and her assimilated Jewish parents, Felix and Lilli von Kahler, would be arrested by the Nazis. The von Kahlers were a wealthy, German-speaking, Austro-Hungarian family who owned sugar beet factories in what was known as Czechoslovakia after 1919. Their Prague home at 18 Under the Chestnuts Street and country chateau, Svinare, were later confiscated by the Nazis, then taken by the Russian communists.

After the Munich Agreement, Czechoslovakia found itself surrounded by Germany on three sides. Nazi Germany invaded the Sudetenland, which formed the natural borders of Czechoslovakia, on Oct. 1, 1938. Bauer and the von Kahlers separately fled for Paris. They later met again in Paris, where Maria von Kahler joined him to work for the underground Austrian Freedom Broadcasting Station in Fekamp, Normandy from 1939 to 1940. Bauer was director of the Austrian Freedom station, broadcasting from Normandy until just before France was invaded in the spring of 1940. The station was bombed and destroyed by Germany a few days after they fled.

The Bauers and von Kahlers fled France ahead of the German army after the Maginot Line failed in June 1940, joining the same exodus route to Bayonne used by an estimated four million people in cars, bicycles and on foot. The route was featured in the 1942 movie Casablanca.

Bauer and Maria von Kahler were married in Portugal in August, 1940 and sailed on the Portuguese steamer SS Quanza immediately afterward to immigrate to the United States. The SS Quanza was the first ship of refugees to flee Nazi Europe.

== Cincinnati and WLWO ==
After several months of speaking to numerous New York civic organizations about the rise of Nazism in Europe, Bauer was contacted by Crosley Corporation in Cincinnati in mid-1941 and became the German language broadcaster at WLWO in Cincinnati, joining an international staff which broadcast daily shortwave war news from Cincinnati and transmitted them from Mason, Ohio to Europe in English, German, Italian, Spanish, Portuguese and French. He and fellow WLWO broadcasters included Giorgio Padovano (Italian) and Edward Beck (French). All three later joined the Voice of America as broadcasters when it was established in 1942.

After Pearl Harbor was bombed on Dec. 7, 1941, Bauer was one of several WLWO staff members who took the night train to New York, joining the Voice of America as a broadcaster on the opening day of its operation on Feb. 24, 1942.³ Programming at WLWO was taken over in February, 1942 by the Office of War Information.²

Bauer was German language writer, announcer and producer for the Voice of America from 1942 to 1944. By 1944, he was chief of the German radio section of the American Broadcasting Station in Europe (ABSIE). On June 5, 1944, at 8 p.m., Bauer was taken to Inveresk House, where he and other broadcasters were sequestered and briefed about the coming Normandy invasion. At about 5:30 a.m. on June 6, 1944, he was taken by jeep to the studio ABSIE shared with the British Broadcasting Corporation, arriving in time for the 6 a.m. broadcast. Bauer was the first announcer in the rotation, so he was the first broadcaster to tell the Germans—in tolkienesque German—that "Der Sturm aus dem Westen hat begonnen" (The storm from the West has begun).4 The D-Day invasion was the largest land, sea and air invasion in the history of the world, and the Allied victory broke the back of the Nazi regime.

== Cold War ==
Bauer rose steadily through the ranks of the VOA. He was chief of the Austrian Service and name commentator for the VOA from 1945 to 1949; chief of the VOA North European Branch in 1949; and chief of the VOA Field Services Division from 1952 to 1955.

He faced Sen. Joseph McCarthy prosecutor Roy Cohn on March 6, 1953, at a U.S. congressional hearing to successfully defend the VOA against accusations that its South American radio program, “Eye of the Eagle,” was Communist. After Bauer's testimony, the VOA was left alone by the McCarthy Commission and Bauer was made head of the VOA European Division, with direct control of radio programming to the Soviet Union and other communist-controlled countries in Europe.

== Diplomatic career ==
In 1953, Bauer joined the United States Information Agency (USIA) as a radio program manager. During his tours of duty as a U.S. Foreign Service officer, he served as first secretary for cultural affairs and as counselor for public affairs. He became VOA policy officer in 1956 and was acting television manager for the VOA in 1957.

His diplomatic career from 1954 through 1967 took him to U.S. missions in Iran, France, Egypt, and India during seminal historic events, including the Shah of Iran’s wedding in 1959 and the bombing of the Cairo airport at the beginning of the Arab-Israeli Six-Day War in 1967. He acted as a Foreign Service Inspector from 1958 to 1972.

After retirement, he taught as an adjunct professor of political science at Kenyon College in Gambier, Ohio, from 1972 to 1979, and at the American University in Washington, D.C. from 1980 to 1982. He acted as a consultant for the Center for Public Policy Education, the Brookings Institution, from 1982 to 1988.

Bauer’s wife, Maria (née von Kahler), is the author of Beyond the Chestnut Trees, a 1984 memoir of their lives together during World War II. The Bauers have two children, Robert F. Bauer, a Washington D.C. attorney who served as Democratic National Committee, White House Counsel and personal attorney for President Barack Obama, and Virginia Ceaser, also of Washington, D.C.

== Publications ==
- Ed., The U.S. and World Affairs: Leadership, Partnership or Disengagement and the Interaction of Economics and Foreign Policy. University Press of Virginia. 1975.
- Ed., The Austrian Solution: International Conflict and Cooperation. University Press of Virginia. 1982.
- The United States and the European Neutrals in International Affairs. (Laxenburg Papers, Hanspeter Neubold, Hans Thalberg, Eds.) William Braumuller, Universitats-Verlagsbuchhandlung. Vienna. 1984.
- Ed., The Threat of International Terrorism, with Gifford Malone and Sheila Muccio. Oceana Publications. 1988.

== Awards ==
- Meritorious Honor award of the United States Information Agency for “outstanding performance of his duties as a lecturer in international relations.” 1972.
- U.S. Department of State's Tribute of Appreciation for sustained contributions as an American Specialist significantly building human foundations of peace between nations and the United States of America. 1978.
- Republic of Austria's Medal of Honor for Service in the Liberation of Austria. 1980.

Robert Bauer's personal papers are on file with the Eisenhower Presidential Library and Museum in Abilene, Kansas, where they are being processed.
