= Jayita Sarkar =

Indian historian

- Born: Calcutta, India
- Citizenship: American
- Occupation: Academic
- Awards: 2024 Bernard S. Cohn Book Prize

Academic background
- Education: Geneva Graduate Institute; Paris-Sorbonne University
- Thesis: (2014)
- Doctoral advisor: Jussi Hanhimäki

Academic work
- Discipline: History
- Sub-discipline: 19th and 20th century, global history, history of capitalism
- Institutions: Boston University, University of Glasgow
- Website: https://www.jayitasarkar.com/

Jayita Sarkar is an Indian-American historian based in Scotland and Professor at the University of Glasgow who specialises in global histories of nuclear infrastructures and territoriality. She serves as co-editor for the book series, InterConnections, at the University of North Carolina Press.

== Background and personal life ==
She received a Ph.D. in international history from the Geneva Graduate Institute and an MPhil in sociology at the Paris-Sorbonne University. She speaks fluent French.

== Work ==
Sarkar was an assistant professor at Boston University before joining as associate professor the University of Glasgow. She has held research fellowships at Harvard University, Dartmouth College, Yale University, and University of Edinburgh. Her research has been funded by the Stanton Foundation, British Academy, and Swiss National Science Foundation. She has been a visiting professor at Ecole Normale Supérieure and Sciences Po in Paris.

Her first book, Ploughshares and Swords: India’s Nuclear Program in the Global Cold War (Cornell University Press, 2022), examines the international and transnational history of India's nuclear program. The book was awarded the 2024 Bernard S. Cohn Book Prize by the Association for Asian Studies for first books on South Asia. It also won an honorable mention from the global development section of the International Studies Association. It has been called "required reading for historians of several different fields – foreign relations, science and technology, and decolonization."

Sarkar has also been awarded the Doreen and Jim McElvany Nonproliferation Challenge Grand Prize in 2018, alongside historian John Krige for presenting "outstanding historical research that makes a direct intervention into a hot topic in scholarly quantitative literature with clear policy relevance."

Sarkar was elected a fellow of the Royal Historical Society. She has contributed op-eds to TIME, Washington Post, Foreign Policy, and Lawfare.
