= Jean-Luc Vez =

Jean-Luc Vez (October 12, 1957 in Fribourg–December 28, 2017 in Fribourg) was a Swiss administrative lawyer. From 2000 to 2014, he was head of the Federal Office of Police of Switzerland.

== Education ==
Vez studied law at the University of Fribourg and graduated in 1985 with a doctorate of law. He then obtained a diploma in international security studies at the Graduate Institute of International Studies in Geneva. He was assistant professor at the University of Fribourg from 1981 to 1985.

== Career ==
From 1986 to 1990, he was a scientific assistant at the now-defunct Directorate of the Central Office for Defense, part of Switzerland's Federal Ministry for Defense. In 1996, he became deputy director of the Federal Office of Police and head of the Legal and Data Protection Department. In 2000, he became head of the Federal Office of Police and remained in this position until 2014.

On April 1, 2014, Vez joined the World Economic Forum as managing director for security policy and security affairs, where he was responsible for operational security. He also led the Forum's cybercrime policy work.
