= Marthe Fare =

Togolese novelist (born 1985)

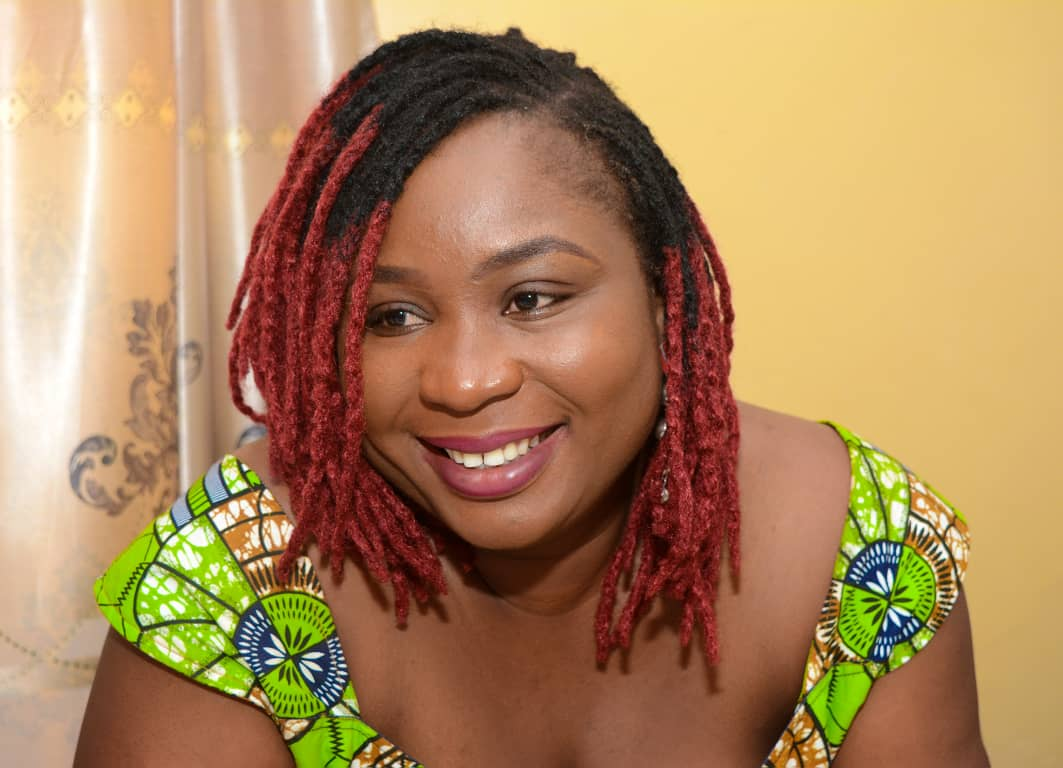
- Born: 1985 (age 40–41); Lomé, Togo
- Other name: Noun Fare
- Education: École supérieure de journalisme
- Occupations: Writer, educator and communications specialist
- Notable work: La Sirène des bas-fonds (2011); Rivales (2014)

Marthe Fare (born 1985) is a Togolese writer, educator and communications specialist. As a novelist, using the name Noun Fare, she has published two best-sellers: La sirène des bas-fonds (2011) and Rivales (2014). She is the coordinator behind Egbe Nana, a television series that presents 52 women who have positively influenced their communities. Fare heads the Communications and PR department of AVNT (Agence Nationale du Volontariat au Togo).

== Biography ==
Born in 1985 in Lomé, Togo, Marthe Fare worked as a journalist while studying modern literature. In 2008, she spent a year as a reporter and host on Togo's TV7. She then attended the École supérieure de journalisme in Lille, France, where she graduated in 2012. Fare also holds an executive master in gender and development from the Geneva Graduate Institute. On returning to Togo, she became a journalist on the Web, making use of the latest technologies.

In August 2011, using the pen name Noun Fare, she published La Sirène des bas-fonds, a 64-page erotic story of a Togolese girl who becomes involved in prostitution before embarking on a more successful path. It turned out to be a best seller. In 2014, it was followed by the rather longer Rivales, which tells of the rape of several members of the same family and of a daughter who steals her mother's lover. Despite its pornographic style, the novel succeeds in emphasizing the threats faced by Togolese women.

As a member of PEN Togo, Fare seeks to promote Togolese literature. She is also the coordinator of Egbe Nana, a project on television and the social networks that presents 52 women who have impacted life in their communities.
