= Pierre de Senarclens =

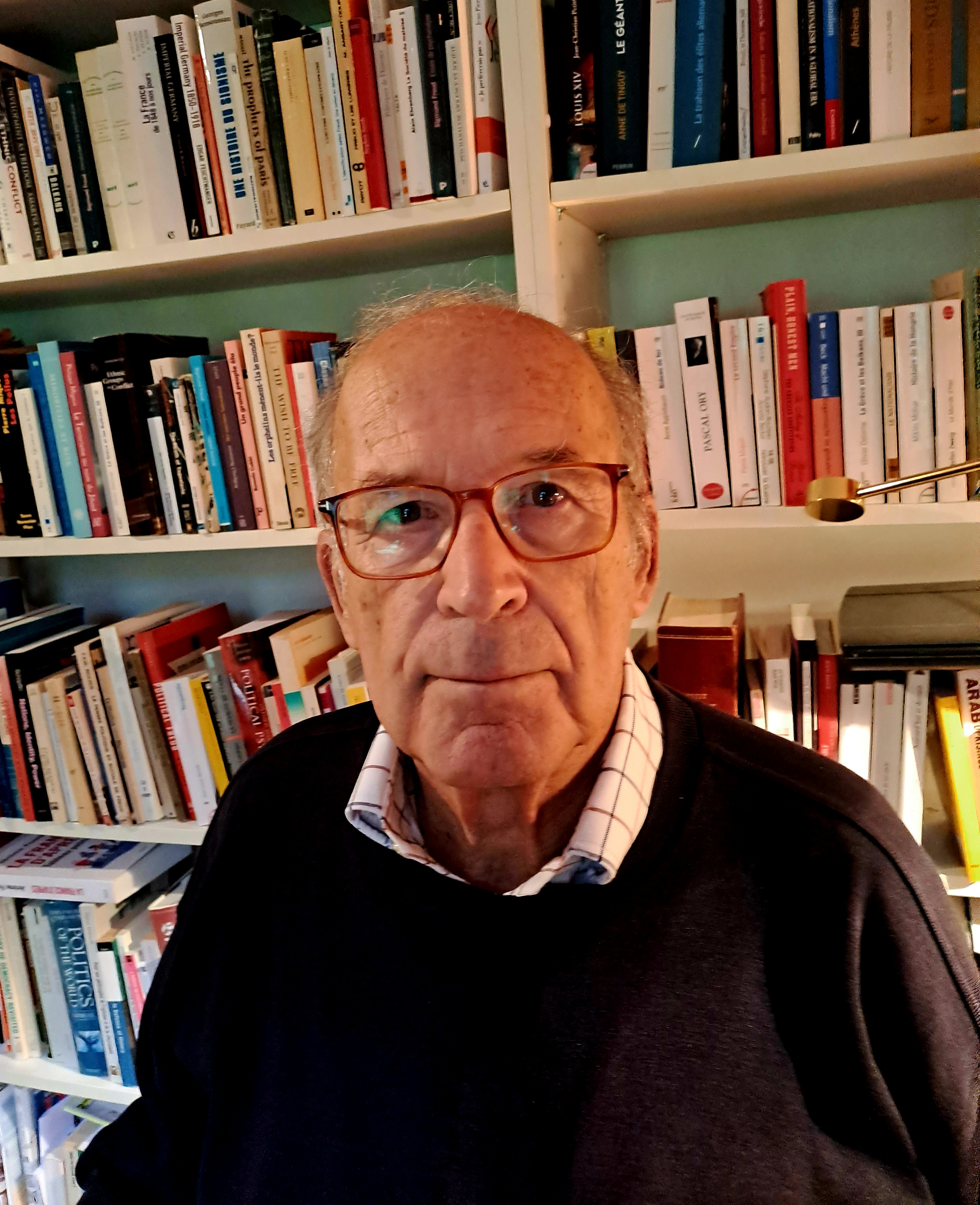
Image of Pierre de Senarclens

Pierre de Senarclens (born January 23, 1942) is a Swiss humanitarian. He is honorary professor of international relations at the University of Lausanne, former vice-president of the Swiss Red Cross, former director of the human rights and peace division at UNESCO and one of the founders of the World Organization Against Torture.

== Education and career ==
Pierre de Senarclens was born January 23, 1942, in Geneva. He did his gymnasium and high school studies in the classical section (Greek and Latin) of the Collège Calvin. He obtained a law degree from the University of Geneva in 1964, a master's degree in 1968 from the Fletcher School of Law and Diplomacy, then in 1973 a doctorate in political science from the Graduate Institute of International Studies in Geneva. He was professor of international relations at the University of Lausanne from 1974 to 2008. He was also the director of the division of human rights and peace at UNESCO from 1980 to 1983.

== Humanitarian work ==
de Senarclens was vice-president of the Swiss Red Cross from 1999 to 2011 and ex-officio vice-president of the International Federation of the Red Cross from 2008 to 2011. He was one of the founders of World Organization Against Torture.

== Private life ==
He is married to Bérengère de Senarclens, psychoanalyst. He is the father of three children, Vanessa, Alexandre and Frédéric.

== Selected publications ==
- Le mouvement Esprit 1932-1941, L'Age d'homme, 1974
- Yalta, Presses Universitaires de France, 1984
- La crise des Nations Unies, Presses Universitaires de France, 1988,
- De Yalta au rideau de fer, Presses de la Fondation nationale des sciences politiques, 1993- Traduit en anglais From Yalta to the Iron Curtain: The Great Powers and the Origins of the Cold War, Bloomsbury Academic, 1995
- Mondialisation, souveraineté et théories des relations internationales, Armand Colin, 2005
- La politique internationale, Armand Colin, 2006
- L'humanitaire en catastrophe, Presses de Sciences-po, 1999
- Maîtriser la mondialisation, Presses de Sciences-po, 2000
- Critique de la mondialisation, Presses de Sciences-po, 2003
- Le Nationalisme, le passé d'une illusion, Armand Colin, 2010
- Les Illusions meurtrières. Ethnonationalisme et fondamentalisme religieux, Éditions L'Harmattan, Paris, 2016
- Nations et nationalismes, Ed. Sciences humaines, 2018
