= Ralph D. Crosby Jr. =

American business owner

Ralph Dozier Crosby Jr. (born September 23, 1947) was president and CEO of EADS North America - now known as the Airbus Group, Inc – from 2002 to 2009. He is a board member of Airbus and of American Electric Power.

== Studies ==
Born in South Carolina, Crosby holds a Bachelor of Science in natural sciences from the United States Military Academy (1969). In 1976, he obtained a master's degree in international relations at the Graduate Institute of International Studies in Geneva. In 1977, he graduated with a master's degree in public administrative law from Harvard University.

== Military career ==
Before entering a civilian career, Crosby served as a U.S. Army officer in Germany, Vietnam, and in the United States. At the end of his military career, he served as military staff assistant to the vice president of the United States.

== Beginning of civilian career at Northrop Grumman ==
Crosby joined Northrop Grumman in 1981 as special assistant to the senior vice president of the marketing and technology department. In 1983, he was appointed director of the group's Washington D.C. office and became its vice-president and general manager in 1985. In 1991, he became vice-president of the business and advanced systems development branches of the B-2 department. He was appointed corporate vice president and general manager in 1994.

When in 1995 the company announced the merger of the military aircraft and B-2 departments, he was appointed deputy general manager of the military aircraft systems branch. In 1996, he became deputy general manager of the civil aircraft branch and he was called to the post of general manager B-2 in September of that year. Finally, he ended his career in the company after being appointed in 1998 president of the integrated systems branch.

== Career at EADS ==
Crosby was appointed member of the executive committee of EADS and chairman and CEO of EADS North America on September 1, 2002. In this capacity, he was responsible for strengthening EADS 'presence in the United States, concluding strategic alliances with North American companies and improving EADS' share of the U.S. market.

== Awards ==
Crosby is the recipient of the James Forrestal Award from the National Defense Industrial Association, and has been awarded Chevalier of the Légion d’Honneur of France.
