= Rick Gilmore =

American economist

Richard Gilmore (born 1943 in New York, New York) is President/CEO of GIC Trade, Inc. (the GIC Group), an international agribusiness company with partner offices in Beijing, São Paulo, Quito, Moscow, and Tel Aviv. He is also Founder and Chairman of the Global Food Safety Forum (GFSF), a non-profit industry organization focused on educational and training activities in Asia with offices in the People's Republic of China (PRC) and Vietnam. A trade economist and businessman with a Ph.D. from the Graduate Institute of International Studies in Geneva, where he was a Fulbright Fellow, Gilmore served as Trustee for Bayer CropSciences, Syngenta Corporation, and Agrium, Inc. He is currently Trustee in the U.S. and Canada for Nutrien. He also served as Special External Advisor to the White House/USAID for the Private Sector/Global Food Security and managing director of the Global Food Safety Forum (GFSF) in Beijing. Gilmore developed two agro-carbon instruments: Commodity Plus Carbon (CPC)and GIC Ag Carbon Intensity Index (GIC ACH).

Gilmore has been a commodity commentator on CNN and Channel Earth, and has appeared on the Today Show and the BBC to discuss food prices. His book, A Poor Harvest, a study of the grain trade, was translated into Japanese. He has written articles on food stabilization, food security, trade liberalization, and venture capitalism, and has lectured at the Agrarian Institute of Russia, Moscow State University, University of Aix-en-Provence, Johns Hopkins University SAIS, Harvard University, Georgetown University, and American University.

Gilmore is on the Board of Investment Circle (Swiss investment group); Volta Rapids Tilapia, Ltd. (aquaculture facility in Ghana); Simplum Group, Ltd. (food safety tracing technology company headquartered in Germany). He is a member of the Council on Foreign Relations, the International Advisory Board of NESsT, the Inter-American Institute for Cooperation on Agriculture, the Johns Hopkins SAIS Advisory Council, and the Science Advisory Board of the Conservation Law Foundation. He was a member of the President's Business Development Council during the Clinton Administration and is now Chairman Emeritus of the Harold W. Rosenthal Fellowship in International Relations, having previously served as chairman since its inception in 1977.

Prior to founding the GIC Group, Gilmore was project director for food policies at the Carnegie Endowment for International Peace, a fellow at the Rockefeller Foundation, director of food policy at the Overseas Development Council, a guest scholar at the RAND Corporation, senior economist with the U.S. Senate Foreign Relations Committee, a legislative assistant in the Office of Senator Hubert H. Humphrey, an economic research assistant with the International Labor Organization's Institute of Labor Studies, and a trade economist with the United States Department of Agriculture's Economic Research Service.

== Publications and Presentations ==
Johns Hopkins, SAIS: Global Food Safety: The Challenge As Seen through the Lens of Health, Financial, Trade and Security Risks, September 29, 2014.

Keynote Speaker, 2014 Agriculture and Food Expo, Harbin, China: September 12, 2014

USDA, Food Safety and Its Global Consequences, August 25, 2014.

Council on Foreign Relations- Moderator and Presenter/Roundtable- Global Food Safety: Managing Health, Financial, Trade and Security Risks, May, 2014.

Live Media: CNBC, C-Span

Farm Foundation Panels, February, 2014

FDLI Conferences: ongoing

2013 Georgia Green Economy Summit, Carbon Financing and Trading: A New Risk Mitigation Strategy, September 25, 2014.

Keynote Speaker, Food Safety and the Evolving Global Supply Chain, China Food and Drug Administration (CFDA)/ Global Food Safety Forum (GFSF), June 15–16, Beijing.

Speech, Supply Chains that Create Value and Reduce Waste, International Food and Agribusiness Management, June 19, 2013.

Speech, FSMA and Third-Party Accreditation, FSMA Import Regulations, Food Chemical News, December 4, 2011–12.

Interview, Der Spiegel, November 12, 2012,

Keynote Speaker, Investment Summit for Food Safety Technologies, Global Food Safety Forum, Beijing, June 27, 2012.

Speech, USDA/NIFA: A Carbon Strategy for Agriculture in a Challenging Market, May 1, 2012.

Director, Carbon Workshop, Chicago Climate Exchange (CCX).

CPC/ Climate Change Workshops: TCX/CBEX, September, 2012

Professor, SAIS, Bologna: Global Agriculture in the 21st Century, May, 2012.

Moderator, E-Training on Food Safety, World Bank.

Lecture and class on Global Resources, Energy and Environment Fundamentals, SAIS, Bologna, Italy.

Speech, Food and Drug Law Institute, Beijing.

SAIS course: Global Agriculture in the 21st Century, January–February, 2012.

Speech, Advanced Biofuels Leadership Conference.

Speech, Cornell University.

Speech, Council on Foreign Relations, Washington D.C.

Speech, Denver Council on Foreign Relations.

Speech, University of Denver.

Regular commentator, CNBC Squawk Box Asia and U.S. with recent interviews on commodity prices, biofuels, food safety, and carbon credit instruments, 2008–2011.

Speech, National Economist Club, Wall Street Green Trading Summit.

Speech, North Dakota State University, Johns Hopkins University, School of International Studies.

Speech, National Farm Foundation, Advanced Biofuels Leadership Council.

Speech, US Department of Agriculture, International Food and Agricultural Trade Policy Council/ São Paulo.

Interview, Australia Farm Journal, July, 2010.

Interview, Venture Equity/Latin America, September, 2010.

Interview, White House Chronicle/PBS and XM, on food safety, April 10, 2009.

“Global Food Security Issues,” speech presented to Ford Fellows of the Global Scholars Program, The Washington Center, Washington, DC, September 29, 2008.

"The Global Commodity Picture: New Industry Drivers," speaker at Commodities Portfolio Management 2008 conference, Boston, September 16, 2008.

Interview with Patrick Barta of the Wall Street Journal, “Investment Strategies in the Context of Market Volatility.”

Chairman, Soft and Agricultural Commodities Investment Asia conference, Singapore, September 3–4, 2008.

NBC, Today Show interview on commodity prices, June 16, 2008.

Reuters interview broadcast, June 18, 2008: SAT 1 (Germany), RTL (Germany), TVB (China), N24 (Germany), Nippon TV (Japan), N-TV (Russia), TV-2 (Norway), KBS1 (South Korea), BBC Arabic, France 2, Sky News (UK), Deutsche Welle (Germany), TV Tokyo (Japan) and TRT International (Turkey).

Speech, Latin America Private Equity World, Miami, July 5, 2008.

"Sector-Specific Opportunities in Latin America." Speech at Latin America Private Equity World, Miami, July 5, 2008.

"Midwest Floods Pushing Up Already Soaring Prices." Interview, Reuters, June 17, 2008.

"Rising Water, Rising Food Prices," Interview with Richard Gilmore, Agribusiness Expert, for the Today Show, msnbc.com, June 2008.

"Ag Commodity Markets and Food Prices." Interview, White House Chronicle, PBS, June 1, 2008.

"Market Dynamics and Pricing of Biofuels." Speech at Biofuels Development Summit, May 15, 2008.

"Venture Capitalism in the Agro Sector," in Inside the Minds: The Roles and Motivations of Key Players in Venture Capital Deals, Aspatore Books, 2007.

"Get Ready for Health Wars," in Barron's, November 7, 2005.

Panel Moderator: "Ag Biotech IP: Progress and Challenges Ahead," BIO International Conference 2005.

"U.S. Food Safety under Siege?" in Nature Biotechnology, Vol. 22, Number 12, December 2004, p. 1503–1505

"Ag biotech and world food security—threat or boon?" in Nature Biotechnology, Vol. 18, Issue 4, April 2000, p. 361.

"A Breakthrough for World Agriculture?" in Voice, Japan, November 10, 1999.

Contributor, National Policy Association and Foreign Agricultural Service, USDA, "Competition, Cooperation, and Competitive Advantage," in The Future Stakes for U.S. Food and Agriculture in East and Southeast Asia, NPA Report #291, 1999.

Contributor, Institute for International Economics. Monograph on trade issues for the next round of international agricultural trade negotiations, 1997.

"Competition, Cooperation, and Competitive Advantage," in The Future Stakes for U.S. Food and Agriculture in East and Southeast Asia, National Policy Association and US Department of Agriculture, Foreign Agriculture Service, 1999.

"Food and Agriculture Companies," in Encyclopedia of U.S. Foreign Relations, Oxford University Press, 1997.

Commentator on international agribusiness, Channel Earth, affiliate of NBC.

Presentation, "How to do Business in India," The MegaShow/FPM&SA, November 1995.

Interview, Bloomberg Wire, October 1995.

Presentation, Congress of the World Union of Wholesale Markets, September 1995.

Visiting Lecturer, Agrarian Institute of Russia, January 1993.

Visiting Lecturer, Department of Agricultural Economics, Moscow State University, January 1993.

"World Agriculture without GATT," Choices, Second Quarter 1991.

A Poor Harvest: The Clash of Policies and Interests in the Grain Trade (Longman, New York: 1982; TBS Britannica, Tokyo: 1982).

"Wheat and Coarse Grains--Stabilization or Status Quo?" in, eds., G. Goodwin and J. Mayall, A New International Commodity Regime, Croom Helm Ltd., 1979.

"Trade Liberalization and Agricultural Prosperity," Newsweek International, October 31, 1988.

"Faces behind the Figures," Forbes Magazine, July 14, 1986.

"International Food Security: The Challenge Ahead," co-author with Barbara Huddleston of the International Food Policy Research Institute, Food Policy, London, February 1983, vol. 8, issue 1, pages 31–45.

"National Food Stabilization--At What Price?" Trends, U.S. Information Agency, February 1981.

Weekly Commentator on Commodity Markets, "Take Two," CNN, 1981–83.

"Grain in the Bank," Foreign Policy, No. 38 (Spring, 1980), published by Carnegie Endowment for International Peace, pp. 168–181.

"Grain in the Bank," Politique Etrangere, Fall 1980.

Visiting Lecturer on Agribusiness, University of Aix-en-Provence, Department of Economics and Chaine 2, French Television, 1979.
