= Basil Germond =

Academic of international security

Academic background
- Education: Graduate Institute of International Studies (PhD)

Academic work
- Discipline: International Security
- Sub-discipline: Maritime security
- Institutions: Lancaster University

Basil Germond is a British academic who is a professor of international security at Lancaster University. He is a Fellow of the Royal Geographical Society, a senior fellow of the Higher Education Academy, and holds a visiting fellowship at the Royal Navy Strategic Studies Centre.

His work focusses primarily on naval and maritime affairs and security.

== Career ==
Germond has a PhD in International Relations from the Graduate Institute of International Studies in Geneva. Before joining Lancaster University in 2011 as a lecturer, he was a visiting research fellow at the University of Oxford and a research fellow at the University of St Andrews. In 2015, he was promoted to Senior Lecturer and in 2022, to Chair of International Security at Lancaster University.

He participated in the consultation process for the drafting of the 2022 UK National Strategy for Maritime Security and has repeatedly given evidence to committees of the House of Commons and the House of Lords.

His writings have been published in several journals, including Territory, Politics, Governance, The Australian Naval Review, Climatic Change, The Geographical Journal, Journal of Environmental Studies and Sciences, Marine Policy, Science of the Total Environment, European Foreign Affairs Review, and Global Policy. He is also a frequent contributor to The Conversation.

== Selected works ==
- Germond, B. (2024). Seapower in the Post-modern World. McGill-Queen's Press-MQUP. ISBN 9780228020882
- Germond, B., & Mazaris, A. D. (2019). Climate change and maritime security. Marine Policy, 99, 262-266.
- Germond, B. (2015). The maritime dimension of European security: Seapower and the European Union. Springer. ISBN 9781137017802
- Germond, B. (2015). The geopolitical dimension of maritime security. Marine Policy, 54, 137-142.
- Germond, B., & Smith, M. E. (2009). Re-thinking European security interests and the ESDP: explaining the EU's anti-piracy operation. Contemporary security policy, 30(3), 573-593.
