= Hugh C. Brooks =

American economic geographer, author, educator, and historian

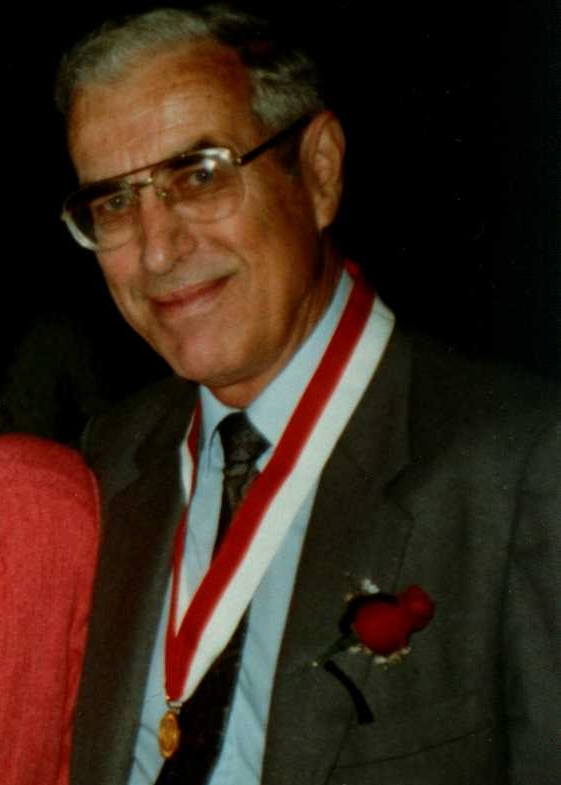
- Born: June 19, 1922; Seattle, WA, US
- Died: October 8, 2008 (aged 86); Pembroke Pines, FL, US
- Occupation: Geographer
- Writing career
- Period: 1954 - 2008
- Subjects: Economic Geography, African History

Hugh C. Brooks (June 19, 1922 – October 8, 2008) was an American economic geographer, author, educator, and historian who specialized in the history and political economy of Africa.

== Life and career ==
Brooks was born in Seattle, Washington, on June 19, 1922. He served in the US Army (1941–1946), where he was a member of Regimental HQ Company, 310th Infantry, 78th Division, and received the Bronze Star, Purple Heart, and Silver Star for his service in the European Theater. He attended the University of Washington in Seattle, where he received the B.A. in 1947, and then the M.A. from the Graduate Institute of International and Development Studies in Geneva in 1948. Brooks began teaching geography at Oregon State University in Corvallis (1950–1951), and then taught at Teachers College, Columbia University, where he received the M.A. (1952) and Ed.D. (1954). His dissertation topic was "Directed Studies in Introductory College Geography." He also taught at Hunter College, 1952–1954.

A Fulbright award enabled Brooks to lecture at the University of the Witwatersrand in Johannesburg, South Africa from 1955 to 1957, where he worked under Dr. John Wellington, before he began teaching at Newark State College as an associate professor of geography, 1957–1961. Brooks then joined the faculty of St. John's University in 1961 as associate professor of Geography and Director of their Institute of African Studies, to "prepare students to work in Africa, or for organizations working within the continent." When the African Center was discontinued, Brooks was made a member of the History Department, where he remained until his retirement, and was the department chair in the 1980s. Brooks was elected as a Fellow of the Royal Geographical Society (London) in 1965. Among the doctoral students he supervised at St. John's were Thomas Hachey, who taught at Marquette University and Boston College, and Peter DiMeglio, who taught at the University of Wisconsin.

Brooks' first wife, Savina Vicini, died in 1994. They had two children, Robert and Alison. (Robert "Bobby" Brooks was an entertainment agent who died in the same helicopter crash with Stevie Ray Vaughan.) Brooks then married Beatrice Shelley and lived in Pembroke Pines, Florida, until his death in 2008.

== Scholarship ==
Brooks co-authored a textbook (with George T. Renner), Directed Studies in Introductory College Geography (1958), as well as (with Bertrand P. Boucher) Field Trips in New Jersey (1962), and (with Richard Keppel) Effective Teaching With Aero-View Transparencies: A Comprehensive Visual Presentation of the Geography, History and Economic Assets of the United States of America (1964). While consulting with McGraw-Hill, Sadlier, and Grolier in the late 1960s, he developed several textbooks for younger students, including Africa: A High School Geography (1966), Africa: A Junior High School Geography (1966), and The Old World: Africa (1968). He co-authored several books on African geography and culture: (with Michael G. Mensoian) Arab World, New Africa (1969); (with Yosef ben-Jochannan and Kempton Webb) Africa: Lands, Peoples, and Cultures of the World (1969); and (with William Norris, and David Dicker) The People of New Africa (1972).

Brooks also produced three books with colleagues from St. John's: (co-editor with Yassin El-Ayouty) Refugees South of the Sahara: An African Dilemma (1970); (co-editor with Yassin El-Ayouty) Africa and International Organization (1974); and (with Francis A. Lees) The Economic and Political Development of the Sudan (1977). He also contributed articles on seven African countries to Grolier's Lands and Peoples reference set, which was first published in 1972 but subsequently went through over ten editions. Brooks worked with the Image Bank in the late 1980s to select photographs for a projected coffee-table book, Africa: The Land and the People, but it was never published.

== Bibliography ==
- "Bobby Brooks Service to Be Held Thursday," Los Angeles Times, August 29, 1990.
- "PFC Hugh C Brooks," Find A Grave website, 19 January 2020.
- "Hugh C. Brooks," Contemporary Authors Online, Detroit: Gale, 2001, Literature Resource Center, Web. 19 December 2014.
- "Obituary of Hugh Campbell Brooks," New York Times, October 11, 2008.
