= Jan Christiaanse =

Dutch politician (1932–1991)

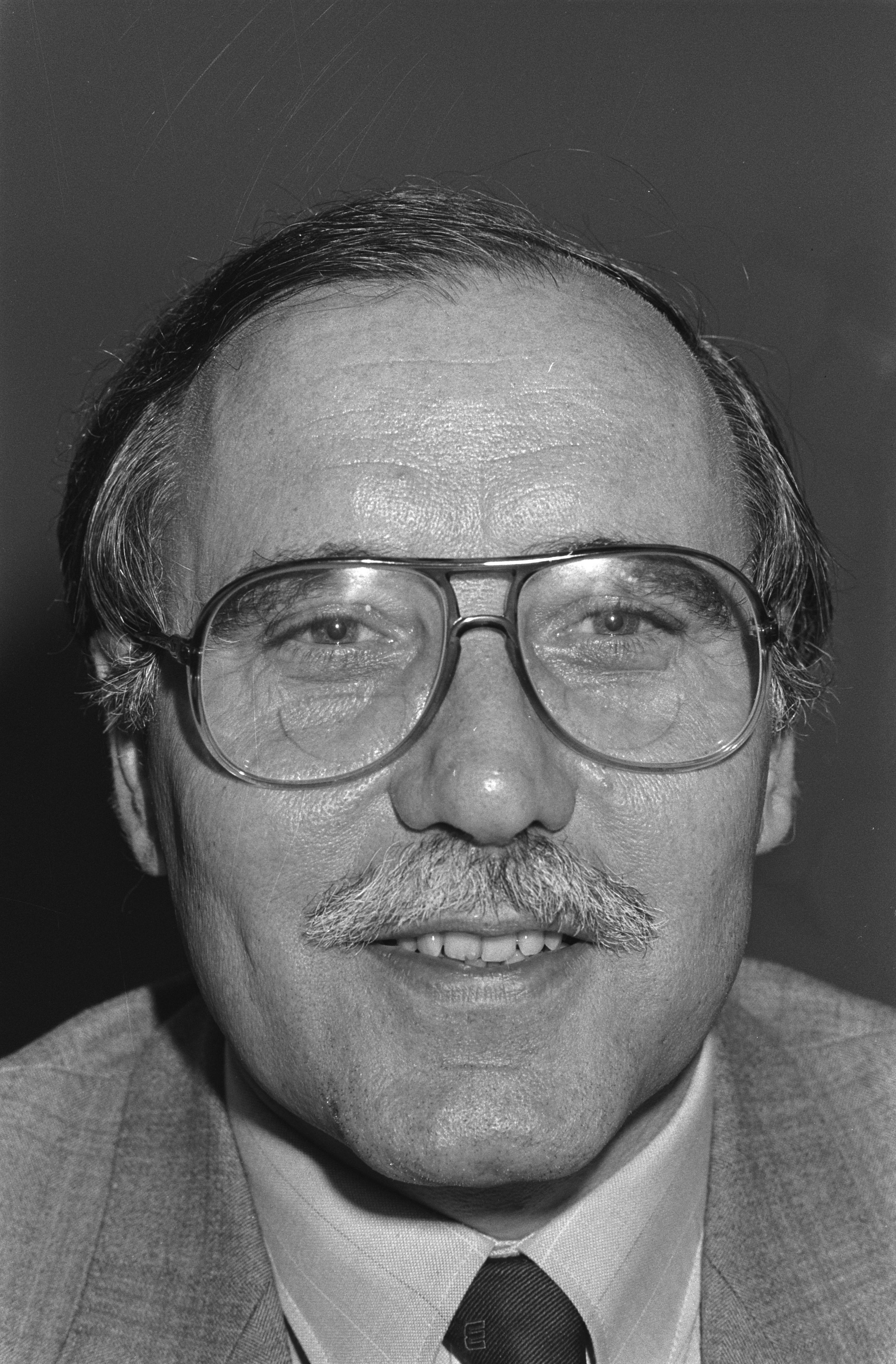
Jan Hendrikus

Jan Hendrikus (J.H., or Jan) Christiaanse (born Gouda, February 8, 1932; died Rotterdam, October 2, 1991) was a Dutch politician and senator for the Anti-Revolutionary Party and later for the Christian Democratic Appeal.

== Education ==
After completing elementary and high school in Alkmaar, he enrolled in 1949 at the Graduate Institute of International Studies in Geneva, Switzerland. In 1953, he obtained a bachelor's in law at the University of Leiden. He obtained his doctorate in law at Vrije Universiteit Amsterdam in Amsterdam in 1960.

== Career ==
Christiaanse started his career at the Ministry of Finance. From 1964 to 1965, he worked as a professor of Dutch and international tax law.

== Political career ==
From 1970 to 1980, he was a municipal councilor in Rotterdam. After a stint as dean of the Erasmus University Rotterdam School of Law from 1972 to 1973, he was from 1973 to 1977 member of the Senate (Netherlands) for the Anti-Revolutionary Party. After a short hiatus, he returned from 1979 to 1991 to the Senate, for a short period as a member of the Anti-Revolutionary Party, but starting in 1980 for the Christian Democratic Appeal. From 1981 to 1988, Christiaanse was not only a member of the Senate, but also chairman of the Christian Democratic Appeal parliamentary group. Christiaanse is known for playing "an important role in reviewing the tax area of provinces and municipalities".

=== Awards and recognition ===
Christiaanse was a Knight of the Order of the Netherlands Lion, honorary secretary-general of the International Fiscal Association. Furthermore, he received the Ad Fontes Medal Erasmus University Rotterdam, the Medal of the City of Paris and the Wolfert van Borselen medal of the city of Rotterdam.
