= Eduardo Ponce Vivanco =

Peruvian diplomat

José Eduardo Ponce Vivanco (born Arequipa, March 8, 1943) is a Peruvian diplomat.

== Education ==
He obtained a bachelor of law and political science at the Pontifical Catholic University of Peru. He also has a master's degree in international relations from the Diplomatic Academy of Peru, and has studied at the Graduate Institute of International Studies in Geneva.

== Diplomatic and governmental career ==
Ponce Vivanco has been Peru's ambassador to Brazil, ambassador to the United Kingdom and ambassador to Ecuador, and to the United Nations Office at Geneva.

He is best known for negotiating and signing a peace accord between Ecuador and Peru on 17 February 1995 when he was vice minister of foreign relations. The accord known as the Itamaraty Peace Declaration ended the Cenepa War, a brief and localized military conflict between Ecuador and Peru, fought over control of an area in Peruvian territory.

In 2010, he became the rector of the Diplomatic Academy of Peru.

Ponce Vivanco is a regular commentator on Peruvian politics in Peruvian media. He writes a regular column for Peruvian daily newspaper El Comercio.
