= Hans Lindqvist =

Swedish politician (born 1942)

Hans Lindqvist (born 9 January 1942) is a Swedish Centre Party politician and lawyer living in Värmdö.

Lindqvist studied law at Uppsala University. He worked as a notary for Stockholm's district court, and subsequently as a corporate lawyer at Westman Marketing AB and other firms. He holds a license from the Graduate Institute of International Studies and the Institut d'Etudes Européennes, both located in Geneva.

After a career in municipal politics, Lindqvist was elected to the European Parliament in 1995. He lost his seat in 1999.
