= Edmundo Hernández-Vela =

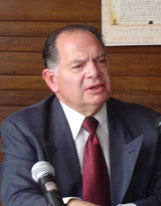
Hernandez Vela

Edmundo Hernández-Vela Salgado (born December 19, 1940, in Mexico City) is professor emeritus of international relations at the National Autonomous University of Mexico (UNAM) and co-founder of UNAM's Center for International Relations.

== Studies ==
He studied medicine, graduating as a surgeon in 1963, as a rheumatologist in 1964 and as an anatomist in 1965. He also made contributions in the field of medicine such as the development of the laboratory method Ra-test for the diagnosis of rheumatoid arthritis.

In the field of international relations, he obtained a licence in diplomatic sciences from the then National School of Political and Social Sciences of the National Autonomous University of Mexico in 1967.

He traveled to Geneva, where he obtained a diploma in international relations from the University of Geneva in 1968; and a doctorate in political science with a specialization in international relations from the Graduate Institute of International Studies in 1970.

== Work ==
He is known for being the author of the Enciclopedia de Relaciones Internacionales, which is in its ninth edition.

== Writings ==
- Edmundo Hernández-Vela Salgado, Enciclopedia De Relaciones Internacionales 1 - 4, 9th Edition, Mexico City: Editorial Porrúa, 2018
- "La Doctrina Carranza en el umbral de una nueva sociedad internacional," Revista Mexicana de Política Exterior (1993)
