= Francisco Rivadeneira =

Ecuadorian minister

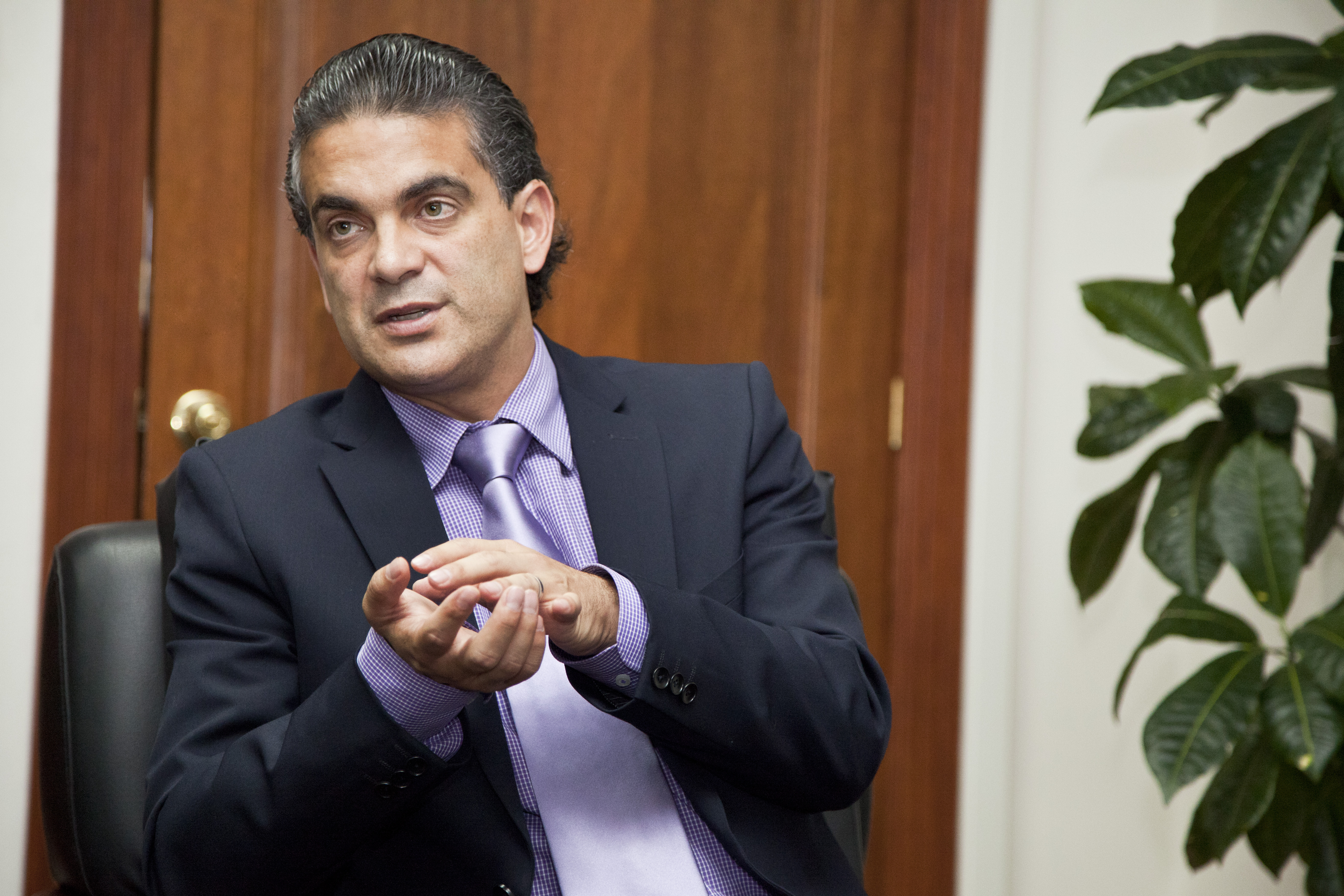
Francisco Rivadeneira in 2013

Francisco Rivadeneira is a former Ecuadorian government official, private sector representative and university professor.

== Early life and education ==
Francisco Rivadeneira was born in Quito - Ecuador, but lived in several countries and cities (Moscow - Soviet Union, New York/New Jersey - United States, Geneva - Switzerland, Washington DC - United States)

He comes from his father side from a family that has been related to the Ecuadorian Foreign Service and the Ministry of Foreign Affairs for several generations.

His father, Rubén Antonio Rivadeneira Suárez was a career diplomat being posted during his professional life at the Embassy of Ecuador towards the Soviet Unión in Moscow, the United Nations in New York - USA, the United Nations in Geneva - Switzerland, the Embassy of Ecuador in Paris - France and the Embassy of Ecuador in Panama City - Panama.

His grandfather, Alfredo Rivadeneira Albán-Mestanza was posted in Colombia, Chile, Panama and France.

His great-grandfather Julio César Rivadeneira Pazmiño, also served at the Ministry of Foreign Affairs.

His great-great-grandfather Belisaro Albán Mestanza, who was the grandfather of Alfredo Rivadeneira Albán-Mestanza, was Minister of Foreign Affairs and Minister of the Interior/Government of President Eloy Alfaro. He was also the President of the Supreme Court of Justice, Governor and Congressman for the Province of Pichincha.

From his mother's side, he comes from a family related to the private sector.

He studied Internacional relations at University of Geneva - Switzerland and specialized in the fields of internacional economics, internacional trade, internacional negotiations, Internacional business, economic integration, and others, at the Graduate Institute of International and Development Studies, at the Universidad Andina "Simon Bolivar", the Pontificia Universidad Católica de Quito and the University of Barcelona.

== Career ==
He served as Deputy Minister of International Trade and Economic Integration at the Ministry of Foreign Affairs of Ecuador from 2010 to 2013. During that time and under his responsibility, the actual Export and Investment Promotion Agency of Ecuador (PROECUADOR) was created, as well as the Trade Offices Network of Ecuador Worldwide.

He was the President of the Commission of the Andean Community (CAN) from 2012 to 2013.

He was Minister of Internacional Trade from 2013 to 2015 and created the ministry.

During that time, he negotiated and signed a trade agreement between the European Union and Ecuador.

He also initiated discussions (Canada, EFTA, South Korea, China, Japan, Mexico), initiated negotiations (Turkey, Honduras) and closed negotiations (Guatemala, El Salvador) with other trading partners of Ecuador.

He was then appointed as Ecuador's Representative to the International Monetary Fund from 2015 to 2021.

He was also the Executive Director of the Chamber of Chambers of Ecuador (Comité Empresarial Ecuatoriano) in 2024.
