= Egidio Reale =

Egidio Reale (April 24, 1888, in Lecce – November 1, 1958, in Locarno) was an Italian anti-fascist and diplomat.

His brother was Italian politician Oronzo Reale. He served as a soldier in World War I. He studied law at the University of Rome and practiced as a lawyer in Rome. As a member of the leadership of the Italian Republican Party, he took an active part in the fight against fascism. In 1926, he emigrated to Switzerland to avoid arrest. There, he formed the anti-fascist group Giustizia e Libertà with Carlo Rosselli, Guglielmo Ferrero and Gaetano Salvemini. In 1929, he obtained a diploma from the Graduate Institute of International Studies in Geneva.

Reale taught at the Graduate Institute of International Studies. He published numerous studies on legal, historical and political subjects. His work concerns democracy in Italy and the right of Italian refugees in Switzerland. He was Italy's ambassador to Bern from 1953 to 1955.

He holds an honorary doctorate from the University of Geneva. His correspondence is held by the Central Archives of the State in Rome.
