= Carlos Lopes (Guinea Bissau) =

Bissau-Guinean economist

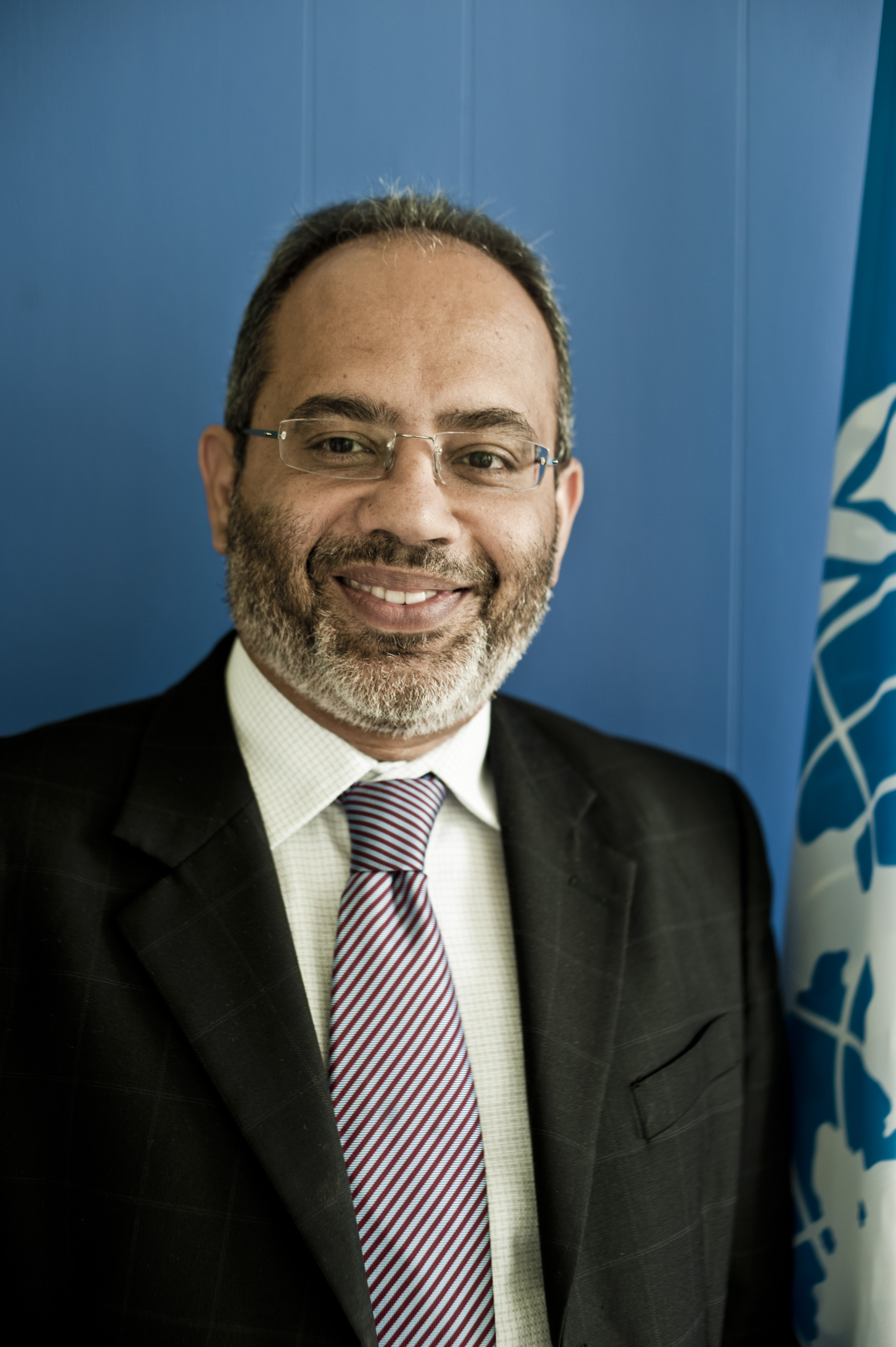
- Lopes in 2011

Personal details
- Born: 1960 (age 65–66)
- Education: Graduate Institute of Development Studies; Panthéon-Sorbonne University

Carlos Lopes (born 1960) is a Bissau-Guinean development economist and civil servant. He was executive secretary of the United Nations Economic Commission for Africa from September 2012 to October 2016, and is a visiting fellow at the Oxford Martin School of the University of Oxford, as well as an honorary professor at the Nelson Mandela School of Public Governance of the University of Cape Town. In 2018 he was appointed High Representative of the Commission of the African Union.

== Life ==
Lopes took a PhD in history from the Panthéon-Sorbonne University in Paris, and has a research master's degree from the Graduate Institute of International and Development Studies in Geneva. He has honorary doctorates from Hawassa University in Ethiopia and from the Universidade Cândido Mendes in Rio de Janeiro, Brazil.

From 1988, Lopes held various positions with the United Nations. He has been a representative in Brazil and in Zimbabwe, he was director of political affairs in the office of the Secretary-General, he was director for development policy at the United Nations Development Programme, he was director of the United Nations System Staff College and an executive director of the United Nations Institute for Training and Research. From 2012 to 2016 he was executive secretary of the United Nations Economic Commission for Africa.
