= Tshiunza Mbiye =

Congolese politician (1941–2021)

Omer Tshiunza Mbiye (30 November 1941 – 23 December 2021) was a Congolese politician and scientist. He was minister of the economy and vice-governor of the Central Bank of Congo.

He held a PhD in economics from Aix-Marseille University and taught international monetary economics at the faculty of economics and management of the University of Kinshasa. Mbiye has published several books and articles on the Congolese economy.

After high school studies in Lubumbashi, he enrolled at the École Nationale de Droit et d’Administration, where he obtained a degree in economics and finance in 1965. He then obtained a diploma in economics at the Graduate Institute of International Studies in Geneva in 1967, and a doctorate in economics at Aix-Marseille University in 1970.

Mbiye served as Vice-Governor at the Bank of Zaire (November 1986 - February 1987), before being called to the government as State Commissioner for the Economy and Industry (February - August 1987).
