= Fernand Corbat =

Swiss journalist and politician (1925–2010)

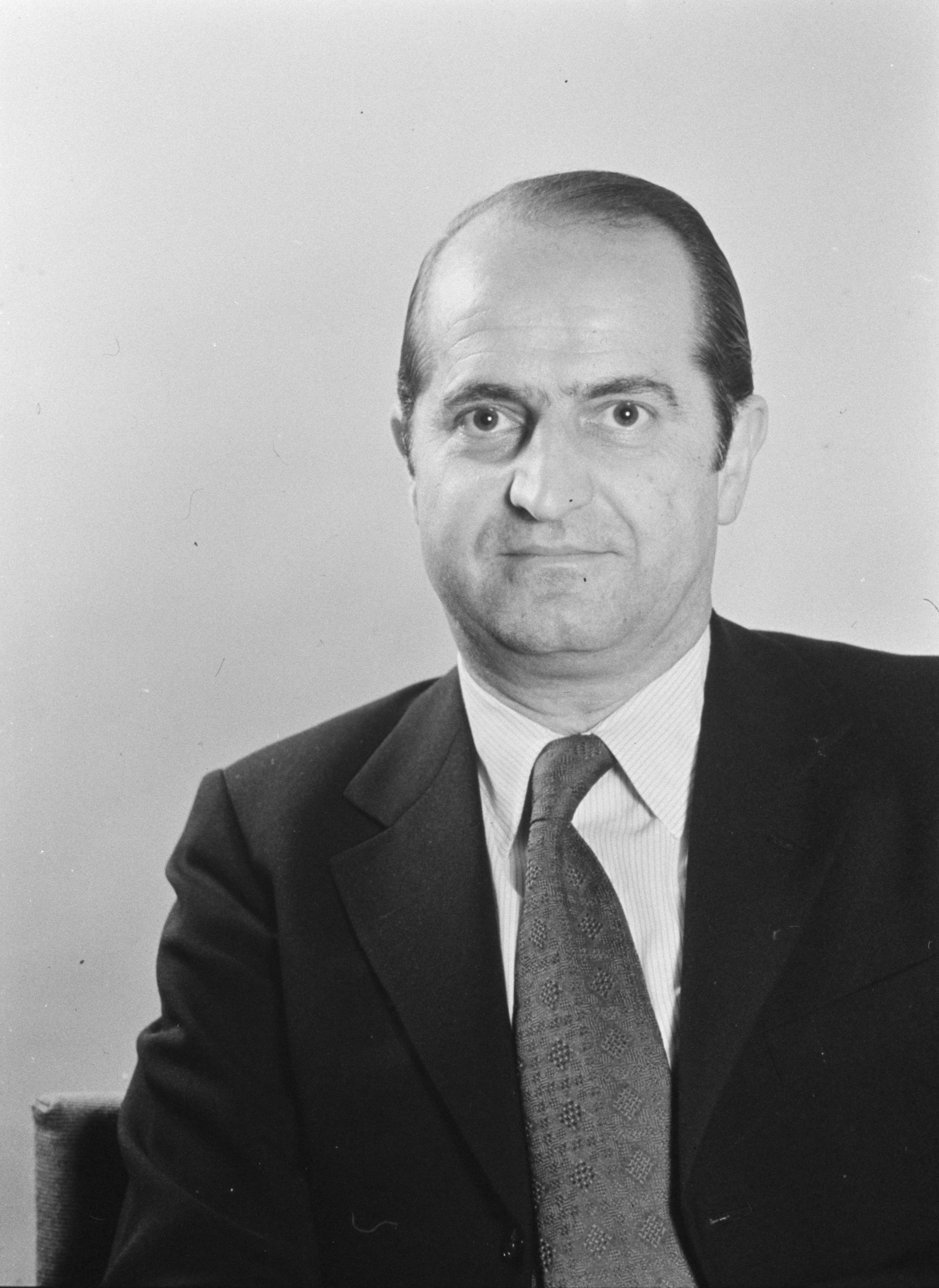
Corbat in December 1971

Fernand Corbat (27 August 1925 – 13 December 2010) was a Swiss journalist, administrator and politician for the Free Democratic Party of Switzerland from the canton of Geneva.

== Life ==
Fernand Corbat was born on 27 August 1925 in Asuel, Switzerland, to Xavier Corbat, a police officer, and Marie Meyer. After studying political science at the University of Geneva and the Graduate Institute of International Studies, he worked as a journalist from 1950 to 1958.

From 1958 to 1963, he was an employee of the Société pour le développement de l'économie suisse (now part of Economiesuisse). (Note: Society for the Development of the Swiss Economy) He then served as a consultant until 1972 and later as director of the Center d'information, de publicité et de relations publiques. (Note: Center of Information, Publicity, and Public Relations)

From 1964 to 1972, he was a member of the Grand Council of Geneva, which he chaired in 1971. After the 1971 Swiss federal election, he served on the National Council from 1971 to 1979.

He was married to Eliane Boand. He died in Chêne-Bourg, Switzerland, on 13 December 2010.
