= Pablo Sandonato de León =

Judge at a major international tribunal

Pabloh León is a judge at the Organization of American States (OAS) Administrative Tribunal and an international law scholar.

== Education ==
He studied law at the Catholic University of Uruguay before obtaining a master's in international relations from the University of Bologna. He went on to obtain a master's in international law at the Graduate Institute of International and Development Studies in Geneva in 2008, and a PhD in international law from the same school in 2013.

== Career ==
He taught international law at the Catholic University of Uruguay law schools and the University of Montevideo.

In 2019, he was appointed judge at the Organization of American States (OAS) Administrative Tribunal.
