= Willem Thomas Eijsbouts =

Dutch university teacher

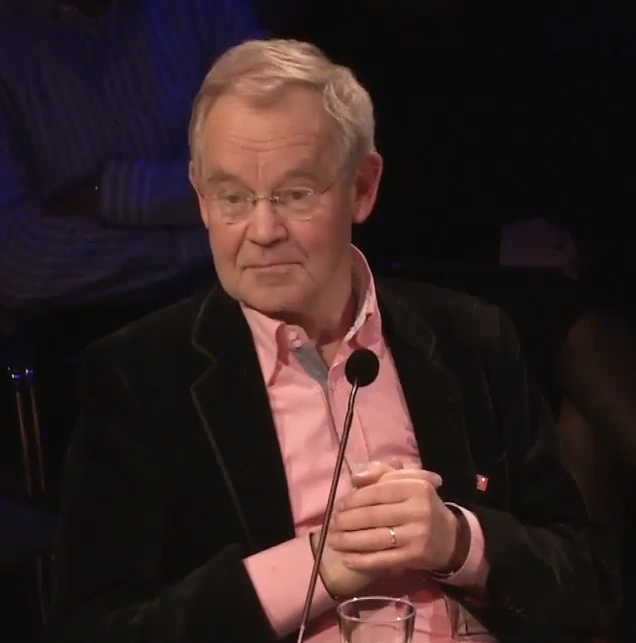
Willem Thomas Eijsbouts in 2017

Willem Thomas (Tom) Eijsbouts (born December 24, 1946, Maastricht) is a Dutch professor of European constitutional law and its history at the University of Amsterdam and emeritus professor of European law at Leiden University.

== Career ==
Eijsbouts attended grammar school and then studied law at the University of Leiden, where he graduated in 1969. He then studied at the Graduate Institute of International Studies and obtained the diplôme d'études approfondies in 1971. After his military service, he became a journalist, among others at De Tijd, de Volkskrant and Binnenlands Bestuur and worked as a freelancer. Starting in 1986, he worked at the University of Amsterdam's faculty of arts, European studies, as a lecturer in European law. In 1989, he obtained his doctorate at Leiden University with a dissertation titled "Law and Chance in the Context of Public Policy". In 1996, he founded the Hogendorp Center for European Constitutional Studies. Starting in 1997, he held the Jean Monnet Chair in European Constitutional Law and History. In 1997, he joined at the University of Amsterdam law faculty, becoming the chair of European Constitutional Law and its History. In 2001, he delivered his Amsterdam University Press inaugural lecture entitled "The Treaty as Text and Fact: The rebirth of European law from the fall of the Berlin wall".

In 2010, he also became professor of European Law at the University of Leiden, where he delivered his inaugural address on 25 November 2011. To conclude, the entire audience sang a new text for the European national anthem written by him in the Leiden auditorium. According to Eijsbouts, the song served to make European citizens sound free, rebellious and inspired by the spirit of resistance. For the text, Eijsbouts returned to Friedrich Schiller's original text, directed against tyranny, just like the Wilhelmus. This appointment lasted until 2015.

Eijsbouts was founder-editor of the European Constitutional Law Review in 2004, and has been a columnist at Het Financieele Dagblad.

Eijsbouts has published, among other things, Europees Recht Algemeen Deel (2020, sixth edition).

In addition to his journalistic and opinion pieces, he mainly publishes on constitutional law, political theory and philosophy.
