= Andreas Guibeb =

Namibian ambassador to Germany from 2016 to 2021

Andreas Benjamen Dawid Guibeb (born January 23, 1954, in Mariental, South West Africa) is a Namibian diplomat. He was Namibian ambassador in Berlin from 2016 to 2021.

== Life ==
Guibeb studied law at the University of the Western Cape in Bellville, South Africa and development economics and international trade law at the Graduate Institute of International Studies in Geneva. Guibeb then worked as a research assistant to Arthur Dunkel, Director General of the General Agreement on Tariffs and Trade (GATT) in Geneva and as program director of the Centre of Applied Studies in International Negotiations in Geneva.

In 1989, he became deputy representative of the Namibian liberation movement SWAPO in Paris, France. In the same year, he became a member of the SWAPO election commission.

He headed the team monitoring the succession of Namibia after independence from South Africa and became first secretary of state in the Namibian Ministry of Foreign Affairs. He also led negotiations for the incorporation of Walvis Bay and the Penguin Islands. Guibeb became Namibian High Commissioner in Zambia. From 1996 to 1999, he also served as chairman of the Board of the national airline Air Namibia. He has also worked as a consultant and board member in various financial and tourism companies and legal advisory firms. He has also worked in regional and international organizations in Africa, Europe and the United States. On January 6, 2016, he became the Namibian ambassador to Germany.

While the ambassador to Berlin, he persuaded German authorities to agree to return to Namibia the Stone Cross of Cape Cross, a 15th-century navigation landmark erected by Portuguese explorers. Guibeb had called for its return in 2018. Guibeb described the gesture from the former colonial power in Namibia as an important "step for us to reconcile with our colonial past and the trail of humiliation and systematic injustice that it left behind."

Guibeb came under public criticism in 2019 because of claims in court that he had failed to settle debts worth about 80,000 euros. German newspaper B.Z. reported he had failed to pay 34,500 euros to the University of Jena for a research contract, and 46,410 euros for communications services at the Namibian embassy. A civil arrest warrant from a district court could not be enforced due to his diplomatic immunity, B.Z. reported.
