= Márcia Donner Abreu =

Brazilian diplomat

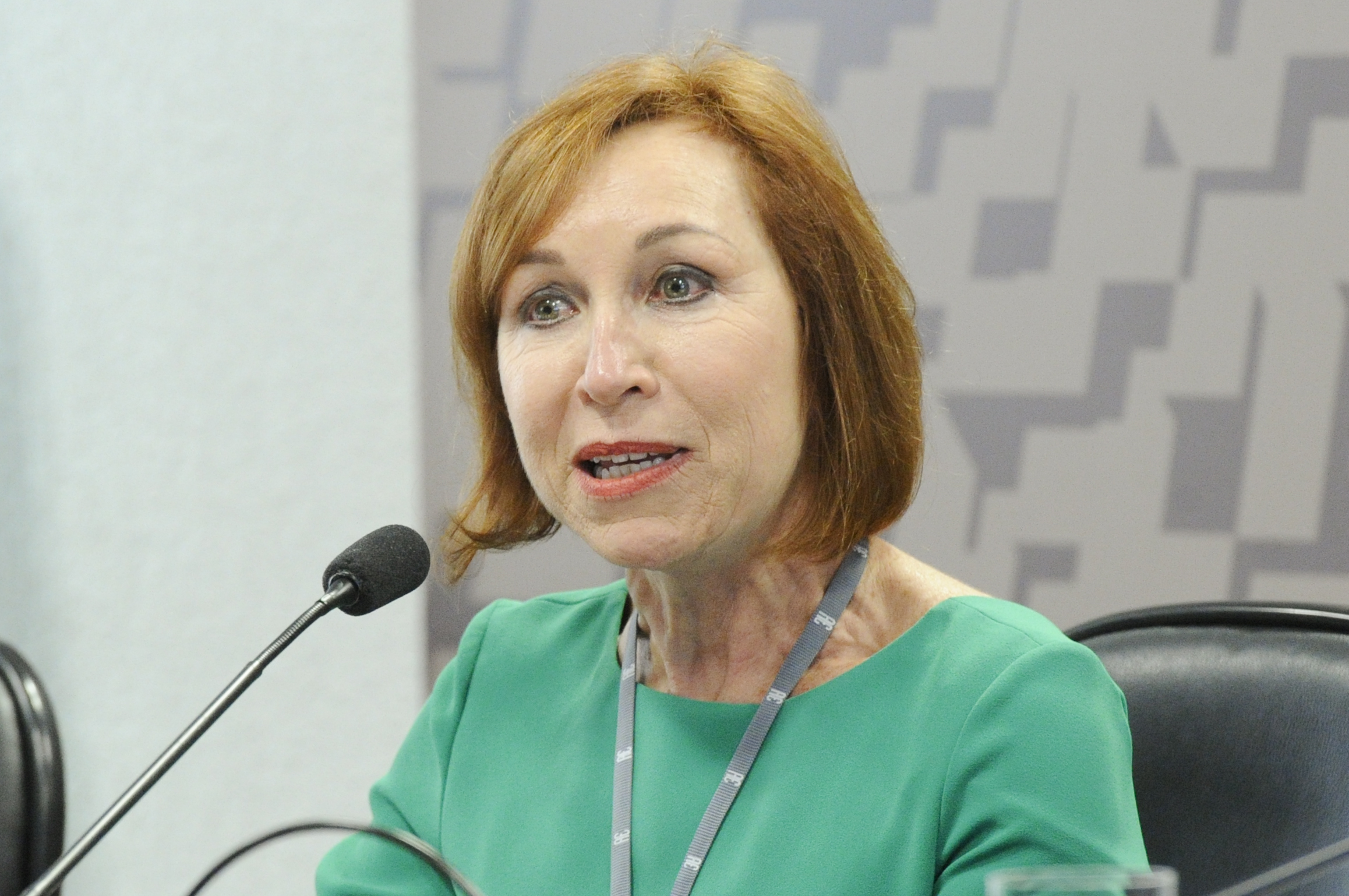
Márcia Donner Abreu

Márcia Donner Abreu (born in Florianópolis, Santa Catarina, May 19, 1961) is a Brazilian diplomat. She is currently ambassador of Brazil to the Republic of Korea. She was ambassador of Brazil to the Republic of Kazakhstan, and to Turkmenistan and the Kyrgyz Republic.

== Personal life ==
Born in the city of Florianópolis in Santa Catarina, Márcia Donner Abre is the daughter of Alcides Abreu and Sara Donner Abreu.

== Academic training ==
She obtained a law degree from the Universidade Candido Mendes in 1981. She also pursued postgraduate studies in development at the Graduate Institute of Development Studies, and in international law at the Graduate Institute of International Studies, both in Geneva.

== Diplomatic career ==
Donner Abreu entered the diplomatic service in 1987, in the position of third secretary, after having completed the diplomatic career preparation course at the Rio Branco Institute.

She was initially assigned to the United Nations Division, where she worked from 1988 to 1989, when she became an advisor to the department of international organizations. From 1989 to 1991, she was an advisor to the special environment division.

Between 1991 and 1995, she was stationed at the Brazilian embassy in Washington D.C. In 1993, she was promoted to second secretary. In 1995, she moved to Montevideo, to take up a position of second secretary at the embassy of Brazil.

Upon returning to Brasilia, in 1997, she was appointed advisor to the foreign office - Itamaraty. From 1999 to 2001, she worked in the financial services and issues division, occupying the functions of advisor and deputy chief.

In 2001, she was sent to Washington D.C., to assume the role of first secretary and, subsequent to her 2004 promotion, councilor. She then moved to Beijing, where she was an advisor at the Brazilian embassy to China.

In 2005, as a requirement to advance her diplomatic career, she defended as part of the course of high studies of the Rio Branco Institute a thesis entitled "Breaking the United States-European Union Duopoly at the World Trade Organization: The G-20 and Multilateral Agricultural Negotiations". It was approved with praise.

She returned to Brazil in 2007, to head the MERCOSUR-II extra-regional negotiations division. In 2008, she was promoted to second class minister. In 2009, she was transferred to Geneva, in order to occupy the role of minister-counselor and deputy permanent representative at the Permanent Delegation of Brazil to the WTO and other International Economic Organizations, a position she held until 2018, when she was appointed Brazilian ambassador to the Republic of Kazakhstan, Turkmenistan and the Kyrgyz Republic.

In 2019, she returned to Brazil to lead the newly created Secretary of Communication and Culture at Itamaraty, a position he currently holds. That same year, she was promoted to first class minister, the highest position in the Brazilian diplomatic service.

In 2022, she was appointed Brazilian ambassador to the Republic of Korea.
