= Peter Hruby =

Czech academic and writer (1921–2017)

Peter Rudolph Hruby (June 22, 1921 – September 26, 2017) was a Czech academic and writer.

Born in Prague, Czech Republic in June 1921, he studied at Charles University in the city after it reopened in 1945 after World War II. He studied philosophy, psychology, literature and languages and organized three national programs: Week of Children’s Joy, 1946 & 1947 (introduced by President Edvard Beneš), Cultural Unity's Youth Club, and a vacation exchange program for Czech and Slovak children (introduced by President Benes’s wife).

After the Czechoslovak coup d'état of 1948 he exiled himself to Geneva. While there he founded the monthly journal Skutecnost ("Reality"). The first issue came out in the spring of 1949 and Peter Hruby edited it for two years. A selection of articles from Skutecnost are available in a collection titled Hluboka Stopa (A Lasting Impression), published by Vilém Prečan in 2008.

In 1969 Peter Hruby received an MA in International Relations from the Graduate Institute of International Studies in Geneva. He worked as an editor and writer for Radio Free Europe in Munich from 1951 to 1957. In 1957 he immigrated to the United States, and worked for Radio Free Europe as a senior editor and writer until 1964. In the evenings he attended Columbia University and obtained an MA in Eastern European Studies.

From 1965-68 Peter Hruby taught for the University of Maryland, Overseas Divisions, then moved to Perth, Western Australia where he worked at Curtin University and then also from 1971 until 1999. He returned to Geneva in 1978 to defend his Ph.D. dissertation, entitled Czechoslovakia Between the West and the East: The Changing Role of Communist Intellectuals. He was a visiting professor at Carleton University in 1985. In 2000 he moved back to Prague and taught at Charles University from 2001 to 2007. In 2007 he moved to Annapolis, MD with his younger daughter and her family.

Peter Hruby published three books: Fools and Heroes: The Changing Role of Communist Intellectuals in Czechoslovakia, Daydreams and Nightmares: Czech Communist and Ex-Communist Literature, and Dangerous Dreamers: The Australian Anti-Democratic Left and Czechoslovak Agents. He died in September 2017 at the age of 96.

== Writing ==
Books

- Hruby, Peter. Fools and Heroes: The Changing Role of Communist Intellectuals in Czechoslovakia (Pergamon Press, 1980) ISBN 0-08-026790-4.
- Hruby, Peter. Daydreams and Nightmares: Czech Communist and Ex-Communist Literature (East European Monographs, 1990) ISBN 0-88033-187-9.
- Hruby, Peter. Dangerous Dreamers: The Australian Anti-Democratic Left and Czechoslovak Agents (iUniverse, 2010) ISBN 1-4401-7499-7.

Dissertation

- Hruby, Peter. Czechoslovakia Between the West and the East: The Changing Role of Communist Intellectuals (Western Australian Institute of Technology, 1979)

== See also ==
- Jan Šejna
- Dymphna Cusack
