= List of volunteer computing projects =

Comprehensive list of volunteer computing projects

Volunteer computing projects are a type of distributed computing where volunteers donate computing time to specific causes. The donated computing power comes from idle CPUs and GPUs in personal computers, video game consoles, and Android devices. Each project seeks to utilize the computing power of many internet-connected devices to solve problems and perform large-scale computational research in a cost-effective manner.

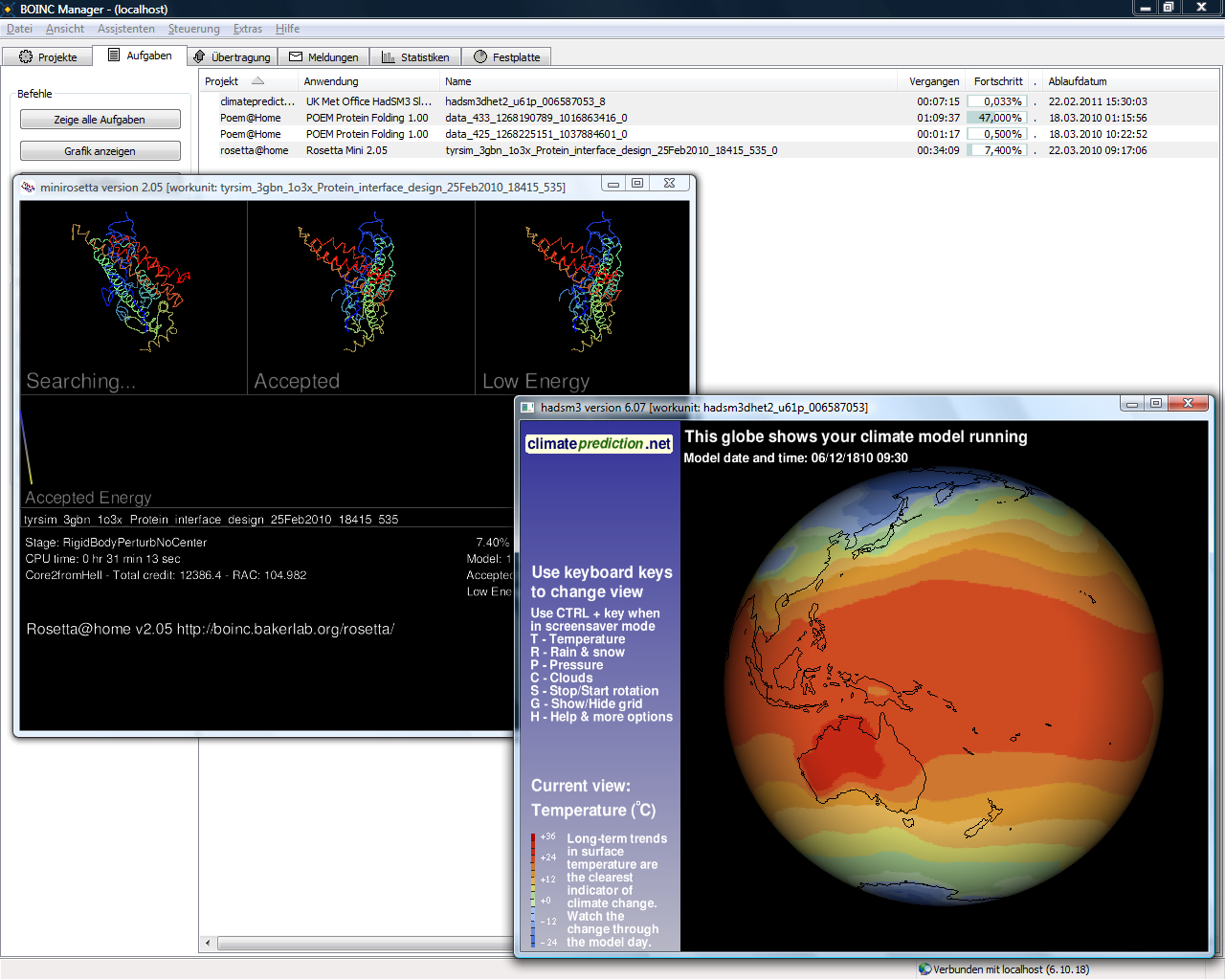
The BOINC manager, running Rosetta@home 2.05 and climatePrediction.net

== Active projects ==
Project	Launched	Sponsor	Category	Research focus	BOINC based	Processing units	Performance in TeraFLOPS
ArchiveTeam Warrior	2013-12-22	Archive Team	Digital preservation	A virtual archiving appliance that will download sites and upload them to the Archive Team archive and the Internet Archive Wayback Machine	No		
Asteroids@home	2012-06-18	Charles University in Prague, Czech Republic	Astrophysics	To significantly enlarge our knowledge of the physical properties of asteroids	Yes	12,055 (Mar 2023)	55.018 (Mar 2023)
Beacon@Home	2026-10-27	Independent	Multiple applications	Runs lightweight citizen science tasks, from mapping background radiation with volunteer Geiger counters to testing random-text searches related to the infinite monkey theorem	Yes	14,914 (Nov 2026)	2.216 (Nov 2026)
BitBOINC	2026-09-28	Independent	Multiple applications	A multi-application project whose tasks include Bitcoin challenge-key searches and fitting gravitational microlensing light curves	Yes	38,697 (Nov 2026)	219.568 (Nov 2026)
BOID	2018-06-20	BOID DAC, decentralized community	Research	The Social Supercomputer for data-driven medical and scientific research involving blockchain technology	No	212 (Mar 2023)	53 (Sep 2021)
BOINC Central	2021-11-26	University of California, Berkeley	Multiple applications	Berkeley-hosted shared BOINC pool that lets researchers submit scientific jobs without running their own volunteer-computing server	Yes	825 (Nov 2026)	3.766 (Nov 2026)
climateprediction.net	2003-12-09	Oxford University	Climate change	Analyse ways to improve climate prediction models	Yes	418 (Mar 2023)	10.166 (Mar 2023)
DENIS@Home	2015-03-20	Universidad San Jorge. Zaragoza, Spain	Medicine and Biology	Simulation of the electrical activity of the cardiac cells	Yes	1,344 (Mar 2023)	8.785 (Mar 2023)
Distributed.net	1997-01-28	Independent	Cryptography, Mathematics	Crack the RC5-72 cipher	No	1,146 (Mar 2023)	
Einstein@Home	2005-02-19	University of Wisconsin–Milwaukee, Max Planck Institute	Astrophysics	Search for pulsars using radio signals and gravitational wave data	Yes	20,177 (Mar 2023)	4,098.577 (Mar 2023)
Electric Sheep	1999-09-30		Visual arts	Make computer art with fractal flames	No	450,000 (May 2015)	
Eternity II	2026-09	Independent	Mathematics	Coordinates volunteer searches for better-scoring arrangements of the Eternity II edge-matching puzzle	Yes	31,355 (Nov 2026)	420.994 (Nov 2026)
Fishnet	2016-03-07	Independent	Chess	Provides server analysis for games played on lichess.org using the Stockfish chess engine	No	38 (Mar 2023)	
Fishtest	2013-02-13	Independent	Software testing, chess	Validates patches to the Stockfish chess engine by playing thousands of chess games at fast time controls between different versions of the engine	No	228 (Apr 2024)	
Folding@home	2000-10-01	Washington University in St. Louis	Molecular biology	Understand protein folding, misfolding, and related diseases, with a minor emphasis in protein structure prediction. Computing power also harnessed the power of PlayStation 3s	No	44,197 (Mar 2023)	29,838 (Mar 2023)
Gaia@home	2019-08-21	Astronomical Observatory Institute, Faculty of Physics, Adam Mickiewicz University	Astronomy	Provide additional computing power to scientists studying the Gaia (spacecraft) data releases	Yes	289 (Mar 2023)	0.227 (Mar 2023)
Gerasim@Home	2007-02-10	Southwest State University, Russia	Mathematics	Research in discrete mathematics and logic control systems	Yes	765 (Mar 2023)	4.823 (Mar 2023)
Golem Network	2016	Independent	Software	Developing a permissionless distributed computing marketplace	No	664 (Mar 2023)	
GPUGRID	2007-12-05	Barcelona Biomedical Research Park	Molecular biology	Perform full-atom molecular simulations of proteins on Nvidia GPUs for biomedical research	Yes	2,042 (Mar 2023)	422.397 (Mar 2023)
Great Internet Mersenne Prime Search (GIMPS)	1996-01-early	Independent	Mathematics	Searches for Mersenne primes of world record size	No	18,741 (Mar 2023)	5,296.905 (Mar 2023)
iThena.Measurements	2019-09-25	Cyber-Complex Foundation	Computer science	Generally computer networks	Yes	9,846 (Mar 2023)	3.970 (Mar 2023)
iThena.Computational	2021-10-31	Cyber-Complex Foundation	Computer science	Generally computer networks	Yes	155 (Mar 2023)	1.575 (Mar 2023)
Kessler@home	2026-11-04	Independent	Space environment	Simulates the growth of orbital debris to estimate the risk and onset of a Kessler syndrome cascade in low Earth orbit	Yes	17,870 (Nov 2026)	68.215 (Nov 2026)
Leela Chess Zero	2018-03-04		Software testing, chess	Trains chess neural networks with deep reinforcement learning. Experiments with training parameters and net architectures	No	19 (Mar 2023)	
LHC@home	2004-01-09	CERN	Physics	Helping physicists compare theory with experiment, in the search for new fundamental particles and answers to questions about the Universe	Yes	3,862 (Mar 2023)	40.377 (Mar 2023)
MilkyWay@home	2007-07-07	Rensselaer Polytechnic Institute	Astronomy	Create a highly accurate three-dimensional model of the Milky Way galaxy using data collected from the Sloan Digital Sky Survey	Yes	31,137 (Mar 2023)	2,048.233 (Mar 2023)
Minecraft@Home	2020-06-24	Independent	Games	Studies questions related to Minecraft, such as the properties of worlds that can be generated from different random seeds	Yes		
Moo! Wrapper	2011-02-05	Independent	Cryptography	Combines BOINC with distributed.net to try to break the RC5 cipher	Yes	1,818 (Mar 2023)	683.872 (Mar 2023)
NFS@Home	2009-09-05	California State University, Fullerton	Integer factorization	Performs parts of the number field sieve in the factorization of large integers	Yes	4,096 (Mar 2023)	50.552 (Mar 2023)
NumberFields@Home	2011-08-12	Arizona State University's School of Mathematics	Number theory	Search for number fields with special properties to assist with the formulation of mathematical conjectures	Yes	14,974 (Mar 2023)	127.692 (Mar 2023)
ODLK	2017-05-19	Independent	Mathematics	Catalogues order-10 diagonal Latin squares that have orthogonal partners, compiling a database of their canonical forms	Yes	1,165 (Mar 2023)	3.006 (Mar 2023)
ODLK1	2017-11-08	Independent	Mathematics	Continues ODLK's database of order-10 diagonal Latin squares with orthogonal partners, running the odlk3 and odlkmax searches	Yes	2,011 (Mar 2023)	10.085 (Mar 2023)
ODLK2025	2024-12-18	Independent	Mathematics	Extends the search for symmetric prime k-tuples into ranges beyond the earlier Symmetric Prime Tuples project	Yes	4,042 (Nov 2026)	0.658 (Nov 2026)
PrimeGrid	2005-06-12	Independent	Mathematics	Search for world record sized prime numbers, search for particular types of primes, such as 321 primes, Cullen-Woodall primes, Proth prime, and prime Sierpinski numbers. Subprojects also include Seventeen or Bust, and the Riesel problem.	Yes	89,193 (Mar 2023)	2,973.132 (Mar 2023)
PRIVATE GFN SERVER	2016-10	Independent	Mathematics	Runs invitation-only side projects on generalized Fermat numbers, with coordination and support through PrimeGrid forums	Yes	5,461 (Nov 2026)	56.969 (Nov 2026)
RakeSearch	2017-09-07	Karelian Research Center, Russian Academy of Sciences	Mathematics	Search of diagonal Latin squares	Yes	528 (Mar 2023)	2.712 (Mar 2023)
RNA World	2009-05-21	Independent research group in Marburg, Germany	Molecular biology	Uses bioinformatics software to study RNA structure	Yes	12 (Mar 2023)	0.016 (Mar 2023)
Rosetta@home	2005-10-06	University of Washington	Molecular biology	Protein structure prediction for disease research	Yes	34,472 (Mar 2023)	44,307 (Mar 2023)
SheepIt Renderfarm			Art	Rendering of 3D Animations	No	600 (Jun 2023)	
SiDock@home	2020-12-19	Russian Academy of Sciences	Molecular biology	Citizen science project for independent decentralized drug design by distributed computing	Yes	4,644 (Mar 2023)	36.659 (Mar 2023)
SPACIOUS@home	2024-09-18	European Union (Horizon Europe)	Astrophysics	Applies volunteer computing to astrophysical data mining for the Horizon Europe SPACIOUS collaboration, including European Space Agency mission archives such as Gaia	Yes	0 (Sep 2026)	4.812 (Sep 2026)
SRBase	2013-01-02	Independent	Mathematics	Trying to solve the generalized Sierpinski problems and the generalized Riesel problems with bases up to 1030, the project is Conjectures 'R Us	Yes	1,267 (Mar 2023)	617.109 (Mar 2023)
The Puzzle	2026-10-30	Rytis Slatkevičius / IĮ Technologica Ecliptica	Mathematics	Checks candidate private keys for a specific Bitcoin challenge address, validating each returned block before crediting work	Yes	4,947 (Nov 2026)	113.634 (Nov 2026)
TN-Grid	2014-05-01	Research Area of Trento of the National Research Council of Italy, University of Trento	Genetics	Gene@home is a scientific project belonging to the infrastructure TrentoGrid. It aims to expand networks of genes.	Yes	4,666 (Mar 2023)	26.697 (Mar 2023)
Twin Prime Search	2006-04-13		Mathematics	Searches for large twin primes	No	34 (Mar 2023)	
USPEX@Home	2017-04-04	Moscow Institute of Physics and Technology, Russian Academy of Science, Skolkovo Institute of Science and Technology	Chemistry, Physics, Materials science	Uses evolutionary crystal-structure prediction to study materials and their properties	Yes	0 (Nov 2026)	0.000 (Nov 2026)
World Community Grid	2004-11-16	Krembil Research Institute	Humanitarian research on disease, natural disasters, and hunger	Disease research, various worldwide humanitarian problems. Subprojects include(d) GO Fight Against Malaria, Drug Search for Leishmaniasis, Computing for Clean Water, Clean Energy Project, Discovering Dengue Drugs – Together, Help Cure Muscular Dystrophy, Help Fight Childhood Cancer. Smash Childhood Cancer, Help Conquer Cancer, Help Defeat Cancer, Mapping Cancer Markers, Human Proteome Folding Project, FightAIDS@Home, Uncovering Genome Mysteries, Let's outsmart Ebola together, Help Stop TB, OpenZika.	Yes	57,439 (Mar 2023)	293.196 (Mar 2023)
WUProp@Home	2010-03-27	Independent	Statistics	Collect various statistics about other BOINC projects	Yes	10,564 (Mar 2023)	1.019 (Mar 2023)
YAFU	2011-09-01		Software testing, Mathematics	Test BOINC server software, integer factorization	Yes	446 (Mar 2023)	13.668 (Mar 2023)
yoyo@home	2007-07-19	Independent	Mathematics, physics, and evolution	Elliptic curve factorization, Riesel/Sierpinski siever, M queens puzzle	Yes	2,900 (Mar 2023)	65.617 (Mar 2023)

== Completed projects ==
Project	Launched Completed	Sponsor	Category	Research focus	BOINC based	Processing units	Performance in TeraFLOPS
ABC@Home	2006-11-21 2014-06-01	Mathematical Institute of Leiden University, Kennislink	Mathematics	Find triples related to the abc conjecture, one of the greatest open problems in mathematics.	Yes		
Albert@Home	2011-11-14 2024-09-25	University of Wisconsin–Milwaukee, Max Planck Institute	Astrophysics	Testing project for Einstein@Home	Yes	12 (Mar 2020)	0.056 (Mar 2020)
AlmereGrid	2006-09-27	Almere, the Netherlands	Multiple applications	A number of applications from local researchers.	Yes		
AlmereGrid TestGrid	2008-02-24		Multiple applications	Test of the AlmereGrid project.	Yes		
Amicable Numbers	2017-01-30 2026-04-20	Independent	Mathematics	Research project to find new amicable pairs	Yes	4,663 (Mar 2023)	1,529.166 (Mar 2023)
AndrOINC		Independent	Cryptography	Broke Motorola's 1024-bit RSA key used to sign the boot and recovery partition partitions on the Motorola Milestone smartphone.	Yes		
AQUA@home	2008-12-10 2011-08-23	D-Wave Systems, Canada	Quantum computing	Used Quantum Monte Carlo to predict the performance of superconducting adiabatic quantum computers on a variety of problems.	Yes		
Artificial Intelligence System		Intelligence Realm Inc		Simulate the brain using Hodgkin–Huxley models via an artificial neural network	Yes		
ATLAS@Home	2014-06-19 2017-04-07	CERN	Physics	Ran simulations of the ATLAS experiment at CERN.	Yes		
Background Pi				Computed decimal digits of pi using digit extraction method.	No		
Biochemical Library		Vanderbilt University	Molecular biology	Performed research using the Biochemical Algorithms Library into proteins and their interactions with small molecules for disease research.	Yes		
BOINC@TACC	2018-07-30 2022-09	Texas Advanced Computing Center	Multiple	Aerospace engineering, computational biology, and earthquake engineering	Yes		
BURP	2004-06-17		Art	Rendering of 3D Animations	Yes		
CAS@home	2010-07-19	Chinese Academy of Sciences	Physics, biochemistry, and others	Provide computing power to Chinese Researchers	Yes		
Cell Computing	2008	NTT Data	biomedical research		Yes		
Chess960@home	2006-03-20	Independent	Games and Puzzles	Analysis of chess 960.	Yes		
Citizen Science Grid	2012-01-01	University of North Dakota	Multiple applications	Animals, Biology, Birds, Climate and weather, Education, Nature, and outdoors	Yes		
Cleanmobility.now	2013-08		Chemistry	Find safer and greener materials for e-vehicle batteries	Yes		
Collatz Conjecture	2009-01-06	Independent	Mathematics	Study the Collatz conjecture, an unsolved conjecture in mathematics	Yes	4,409 (Mar 2020)	18,532 (Mar 2020)
Comcute	2010 2016	Gdańsk University of Technology, Faculty of Electronics, Telecommunications and Informatics	Mathematics, Artificial intelligence, Physics	Genetic positioning of fire stations, image processing techniques, Mersenne-number finding, and distributed detection selected features in data streams	No		
Compute for Humanity	2015-08 2017	Independent	Cryptocurrencies, Charitable Organizations	Generating cryptocurrencies to sell for money to be donated to charities.	No		
Constellation		Students at the University of Stuttgart, Germany	Aerospace, Engineering	Various aerospace-related science and engineering problems.	Yes		
Correlizer	2011	EpiGenSys Consortium and EraSysBio+, part of the Seventh Framework Program of the European Union	Genetics	The sequential organization of genomes, and its connection to their 3D architectural organization.	Yes		
Cosmology@Home	2007-06-26 2024-01	Institut d'Astrophysique de Paris	Astronomy	Find the most accurate models that best describe the universe	Yes	4,083 (Mar 2023)	17.034 (Mar 2023)
DIMES				Maps the structure and evolution of the Internet infrastructure, letting users see how the Internet looks from their home	No		
DistributedDataMining	2010-03-04 2018-04-20		Data analysis, machine learning	Research in the various fields of data analysis and machine learning, such as prediction of market value of companies'shares and analysis of medical data	Yes		
DistrRTgen	2008-01-12 2014-06	Independent	Cryptography	Analysis of hash strength for password security by developing rainbow tables.	Yes		
DNA@home		Rensselaer Polytechnic Institute		Discovered what regulates the genes in DNA using statistical algorithms.	Yes		
Docking@Home	2006-09-11 2014-05-23	University of Delaware		models protein-ligand docking using the CHARMM program.	Yes		
DreamLab	2015-09-112025-04-02	Garvan Institute of Medical Research, Australia	Cancer research	Breast, ovarian, prostate and pancreatic cancer; COVID-19	No	250,000 (Mar 2023)	
DrugDiscovery@home		Independent	Drug design	Supported in silico drug design of chemical compounds for medicines in the fields of cancer and neurodegenerative diseases.	Yes		
Enigma@Home	2007-09-09	Cryptography	Cryptography	Decode three unbroken Enigma messages from World War II	Yes		
eOn	2014-05-08	University of Texas at Austin	Chemistry	Calculated the evolution of an atomic-scale system over time, such as a chemical reaction or diffusion.	Yes		
Evolution@Home	2001-04-03			Uses evolutionary algorithms to optimize the parameters of different kinds of machine learning algorithms	No		
Five or Bust	2011-02			Find a prime or probable prime of the form 2^{n}+k for all odd k < 78557 (the dual Sierpinski problem), the last probable prime found is 2^{9092392}+40291, and this project stopped when this probable prime was found.	No		
FreeHAL	2006 2012	Independent	Artificial intelligence	Compute essential information for software which seeks to imitate human conversation.	Yes		
Genome@home	2001-02-01 2004-03-08	Stanford University	Molecular biology	Designed new genes that can form working proteins in the cell that have not been found in nature.	No		
GoofyxGrid@Home	2016	Independent	Mathematics	Look for Infinite monkey theorem	Yes		
Goldbach's Conjecture	2009-11-09 2011-06			Tests Goldbach's weak conjecture.	Yes		
Golem@home	2000 2001-09-03	Brandeis University	Robotics	Used evolutionary computation to design robotic locomotion systems.	No		
Graceful Tree Verification Project	2008-11-22 2010-02-21	Independent	Mathematics	Used a computational approach to the graceful tree conjecture, proving that every tree with at most 35 vertices is graceful	No		
HashClash	2005-11-24		Cryptography	Find collisions in the MD5 hash algorithm	Yes		
Hydrogen@Home	2007-10-22 2011-02			Searches for the most efficient method of hydrogen production	Yes		
Ibercivis	2008-06-22 2016-07	Spanish universities and research centers	Multiple applications	Research in physics, material medicine, and biomedicine	Yes		
Ideologias@home	2011-05-19	Complutense University of Madrid, Spain	Society	Used social networking mathematical models to study the ideological evolution of a group of people over time.	Yes		
Leiden Classical	2005-05-12 2018-06-05	Leiden University, the Netherlands	Chemistry	General classical mechanics for students or scientists	Yes		
vLHCathome (not to be confused with LHC@home above)	2011-08-01 2017-03	CERN	Physics	Run simulations of high-energy particle collisions in a computational search for new fundamental particles for the Large Hadron Collider at CERN	Yes		
M4 Project	2006-01-09 2009-11-15		History	Decrypts Enigma messages from World War II	No		
Majestic-12				Uses a distributed web crawler program to index web sites for a distributed search engine	No		
Magnetism@home	2008-06-09	Donetsk Institute for Physics and Technology, Ukraine	Magnetism, nanotechnology	Explored magnetization patterns.	Yes		
Malaria Control Project	2006-12-19 2016-01-28	Swiss Tropical Institute	Epidemiology	Simulate the transmission dynamics and health effects of malaria.	Yes		
Mersenne@home	2012	Independent	Mathematics	Searched for Mersenne primes. Discontinued because the creator lacked time to administer it	Yes		
MindModeling@Home	2007-03-17	University of Dayton Research Institute and Wright State University	Cognitive science	Builds cognitive models of the human mind	Yes		
MLC@Home	2020-06-30 2022-10-02	University of Maryland, Baltimore County	Mathematics	Understanding and interpreting complex machine learning models	Yes		
MoneyBee	2000-09 2010		Finance		No		
Muon1 Distributed Particle Accelerator Design	2017		Physics	Simulate and design parts of the Neutrino Factory particle accelerator	No		
Najmanovich Research Group		Université de Sherbrooke	Molecular biology	Research in molecular recognition	Yes		
nanoHUB@Home	2015-01-30	Purdue University	Nanoscience	Research in nanoscience and nanotechnology	Yes	10 (Mar 2023)	0.000 (Mar 2023)
Neurona@home	2011-06-14	Complutense University of Madrid, Spain	Neural network	Simulating the behavior of a large and complex network of cellular automata neurons.	Yes		
NFSNET	2010		Integer factorization	Used the general number field sieve to factor increasingly large integers. Discontinued and replaced by NFS@Home.	No		
NNGenerator	2014-10-20 2016	Independent	Mathematics, finance, and artificial neural networks	Distributed system based on neural networks for analysis and forecasting time series	No		
OProject@Home	2012-08-13	Olin Library, Rollins College	Mathematics	Algorithm analysis. The library is open and available in the Code.google.com SVN repository.	Yes		
Optima@home		Institute for Systems Analysis, Russian Academy of Sciences	Optimization	Solve various large-scale optimization problems. Currently finding molecular conformations which have minimal potential energy.	Yes		
orbit@home	2008-04-03 2013-02-16	Planetary Science Institute	Astronomy	Monitored and studied the hazards posed by near-earth asteroids.	Yes		
Pi Segment	2006	Independent project	Mathematics	Looked for specific digits (in binary) of Pi and make volunteer computing more popular in China	No		
Pirates@Home	2004-02-06	1 Vassar College 2 Spy Hill Research	Software testing	Mission 1 helped to develop the Einstein@Home screensaver Tested BOINC's forum software for possible use by Interactions in Understanding the Universe	Yes		
POEM@Home	2007-13-11 2016-10-04	University of Karlsruhe, Germany	Molecular biology	Protein structure prediction, cellular signaling, protein aggregation, and drug design	Yes		
Predictor@home	2004-05-04	The Scripps Research Institute	Molecular biology	Test and evaluate new algorithms and methods of protein structure prediction in the context of the Sixth Biannual CASP experiment	Yes		
Primaboinca	2010-07-30 2020-05-31	RheinMain University of Applied Sciences	Mathematics	Search for counterexamples to Agrawal's conjecture and Popovych's conjecture, which relate to the identification of prime numbers	Yes		
Proteins@home	2006-09-15	École polytechnique	Protein structure prediction	Contribute to a better understanding of many diseases and pathologies and to progress in Medicine and Technology	Yes		
QMC@Home	2006-03-03 2013-01	University of Münster, Germany	Chemistry	Study the structure and reactivity of molecules using quantum chemistry and Monte Carlo techniques	Yes		
Quake Catcher Network	2008-02-03 2023-06-01	Stanford University	Seismology	Uses accelerometers connected to personal computers to detect earthquakes and to educate about seismology	Yes	215 (Mar 2023)	0.000 (Mar 2023)
QuChemPedIA@home	2019-07-01 2022-09-29	Université Anger	Molecular Chemistry	Help for chemical researchers	Yes	26 (Mar 2023)	0.000 (Mar 2023)
Radioactive@home	2011-10-21	Poland	Physics	Real-time radiation monitoring, detected by gamma sensors connected to volunteer computers	Yes	169 (Mar 2023)	0.089 (Mar 2023)
RALPH@home	2006-02-10	University of Washington	Software testing	Test project for Rosetta@home	Yes	22 (Mar 2023)	0.000 (Mar 2023)
Ramanujan machine	2021-10-14	Independent	Mathematics	Conjecturing new mathematical formulas	Yes	1,514 (Mar 2023)	4.368 (Mar 2023)
Riesel Sieve			Mathematics	Prove that 509,203 is the smallest Riesel number, by finding a prime of the form k × 2^{n} − 1 for all odd k smaller than 509,203. Merged with PrimeGrid.	Yes		
Renderfarm.fi	2009-summer	Independent (Finnish)	Rendering	2D and 3D rendering for animation artists	Yes		
RSA Lattice Siever	2009 2012-08		Integer factorization	Assisted other factoring projects to achieve their academic goals. Merged into NFS@Home because its server was outdated	Yes		
SAT@home	2011-09-29 2017-02	Siberian Branch of the Russian Academy of Sciences	Cryptanalysis, Mathematics	Various applications related to the boolean satisfiability problem, inversion of specific stream cipher functions	Yes		
Second Computing	2008-04-10 2012-08			Assesses biopolymer dynamics, and models the behavior of clonal colonies in a prairie ecosystem	Yes		
SETI@home	1999-05-17 2020-03-31	University of California, Berkeley	Astrobiology	Search for extraterrestrial life by analyzing specific radio frequencies emanating from space	Yes		
SETI@home beta	2006-01-12 2020-03-31	University of California, Berkeley	Software testing	Test project of SETI@home	Yes		
SIMAP	2006-04-26 2014-05-30	University of Vienna	Molecular biology	Calculated similarities between proteins	Yes		
SLinCA@Home		G.V.Kurdyumov Institute for Metal Physics of the National Academy of Sciences of Ukraine	Materials science	Studies scaling laws in cluster aggregation	Yes		
Spinhenge@home	2006-05-19 2011-09-28	Bielefeld University of Applied Sciences	Nanotechnology	Studied nano-magnetic molecules for research into localized tumor chemotherapy and micro-memory.	Yes		
Stop@home	2017-02-28 2018-01	Independent	Mathematics	Looking for prime k-tuples	Yes		
Sudoku@vtaiwan	2011-01-05 2013-09-05	National Center for High-performance Computing (NCHC), Hsinchu Science and Industrial Park, Hsinchu City, Taiwan.	Games and Puzzles	Confirmed solution to the "Minimum Sudoku Problem." After running for more than 2½ years, the project was completed - it was confirmed that no 16-clue Sudoku exists, and so the fewest clues possible is 17	Yes		
Superlink@Technion	2007-05-03	Technion – Israel Institute of Technology	Genetic linkage analysis	Uses genetic linkage analysis to help find disease-provoking genes.	Yes		
Surveill@Home		University of Coimbra		Monitor and test websites for failure rates and overall performance	Yes		
theSkyNet	2011-09-13 2018-05-02	International Centre for Radio Astronomy Research	Astronomy	Analysis of radio astronomy data from telescopes such as the Australian Square Kilometre Array Pathfinder and The Square Kilometre Array	Yes		
uFluids@Home	2005-09-19 2010-11	Purdue University	Physics, Aeronautics	Simulated microfluidics problems and two-phase flows in microgravity	Yes		
Universe@Home	2015-02-21 2024-11-11	Nicolaus Copernicus Astronomical Center of the Polish Academy of Sciences	Astronomy	Computational astrophysics, computer simulation of stars, galaxies, and the Universe	Yes	3,547 (Mar 2023)	383.863 (Mar 2023)
Virtual Prairie	2008	University of Houston	Botanical ecosystems	Provided ecological guidelines on the design of prairies with the best potential for water purification	Yes		
VTU@home		Vilnius Gediminas Technical University and Kaunas University of Technology	Software testing	Supported various research projects at Vilnius Gediminas Technical University	Yes		
WEP-M+2 Project	2006-05-12	London, England, United Kingdom	Mathematics	Factorization of Mersenne+2 numbers	Yes	335 (Mar 2023)	2.254 (Mar 2023)
Wieferich@Home	2007-12-29 2017		Mathematics	Searches for new Wieferich primes	No		
EDGeS@Home	2009-10	MTA SZTAKI Laboratory of Parallel and Distributed Systems, Hungary	Multiple applications	Support the execution of selected scientific applications developed by the EGEE and EDGeS community	Yes		
SZTAKI Desktop Grid	2005-05-26	MTA SZTAKI Laboratory of Parallel and Distributed Systems, Hungary	Mathematics	Find all the generalized binary number systems (in which bases are matrices and digits are vectors) up to dimension 11, understand basic universality classes of nonequilibrium system	Yes		
TANPAKU	2005-08-02	Tokyo University of Science	Molecular biology	Protein structure prediction using the Brownian dynamics method	Yes		
The Lattice Project	2004-06-30	University of Maryland Center for Bioinformatics and Computational Biology	Life science	Various scientific analysis projects	Yes		

== See also ==
- List of grid computing projects
- List of citizen science projects
- List of crowdsourcing projects
- List of free and open-source Android applications
- List of Berkeley Open Infrastructure for Network Computing (BOINC) projects
