= Riesel =

Riesel may refer to:

== People ==
- Hans Riesel (1929–2014), Swedish mathematician who discovered a Mersenne prime
- Victor Riesel (1913–1995), American labor union journalist

== In Mathematics ==
- Riesel number, an odd natural number k for which the integers of the form k·2^{n}−1 are all composite
- Riesel Sieve, a project to prove the smallest Riesel number

== Places ==
- Riesel, Texas
- Riesel, the German name for the French city of Lille, also Rijsel in Dutch.
