= SR5 =

SR5 may refer to:

- Matich SR5, a sports car
- Music Man StingRay 5, a bass guitar
- Toyota SR5, a name for the Toyota Hilux pickup truck in North America
- State Road 5 or State Route 5; see List of highways numbered 5
- Sierpinski/Riesel Base 5 Problem, a generalization of the Sierpinski and Riesel problems to base 5
- SR-5, Chinese export 122/220mm MLRS.
- A trim for Toyota trucks and large SUVs
