= Proth prime =

Prime number of the form k*(2^n)+1

- Named after: François Proth
- Publication year: 1878
- Author of publication: Proth, Francois
- No. of known terms: 4304683178 below 2^{72}
- Conjectured no. of terms: Infinite
- Subsequence of: Proth numbers, prime numbers
- Formula: k × 2^{n} + 1
- First terms: 3, 5, 13, 17, 41, 97, 113
- Largest known term: 10223 × 2^{31172165} + 1 (as of December 2019)
- OEIS index: A080076; Proth primes: primes of the form k*2^m + 1 with odd k < 2^m, m ≥ 1

A Proth number is a natural number N of the form $N = k \times 2^n+1$ where k and n are positive integers, k is odd and $2^n > k$. A Proth prime is a Proth number that is prime. They are named after the French mathematician François Proth. The first few Proth primes are

3, 5, 13, 17, 41, 97, 113, 193, 241, 257, 353, 449, 577, 641, 673, 769, 929, 1153, 1217, 1409, 1601, 2113, 2689, 2753, 3137, 3329, 3457, 4481, 4993, 6529, 7297, 7681, 7937, 9473, 9601, 9857 (OEIS: A080076).

It is still an open question whether an infinite number of Proth primes exist. It was shown in 2022 that the reciprocal sum of Proth primes converges to a real number near 0.747392479, substantially less than the value of 1.093322456 for the reciprocal sum of Proth numbers.

The primality of Proth numbers can be tested more easily than many other numbers of similar magnitude.

== Definition ==
A Proth number takes the form $N=k \times 2^n +1$ where k and n are positive integers, $k$ is odd and $2^n>k$. A Proth prime is a Proth number that is prime. Without the condition that $2^n > k$, all odd integers larger than 1 would be Proth numbers.

== Primality testing ==
The primality of a Proth number can be tested with Proth's theorem, which states that a Proth number $p$ is prime if and only if there exists an integer $a$ for which

$a^{\frac{p-1}{2}}\equiv -1 \pmod{p}.$

This theorem can be used as a probabilistic test of primality, by checking for many random choices of $a$ whether $a^{\frac{p-1}{2}}\equiv -1 \pmod{p}.$ If this fails to hold for several random $a$, then it is very likely that the number $p$ is composite. This test is a Las Vegas algorithm: it never returns a false positive but can return a false negative; in other words, it never reports a composite number as "probably prime" but can report a prime number as "possibly composite".

In 2008, Sze created a deterministic algorithm that runs in at most $\tilde{O}((k\log k+\log N)(\log N)^2)$ time, where Õ is the soft-O notation. For typical searches for Proth primes, usually $k$ is either fixed (e.g. 321 Prime Search or Sierpinski Problem) or of order $O(\log N)$ (e.g. Cullen prime search). In these cases algorithm runs in at most $\tilde{O}((\log N)^3)$, or $O((\log N)^{3+\epsilon})$ time for all $\epsilon>0$. There is also an algorithm that runs in $\tilde{O}((\log N)^{24/7})$ time.

Fermat numbers are a special case of Proth numbers, wherein k=1. In such a scenario Pépin's test proves that only base a=3 need to be checked to deterministically verify or falsify the primality of a Fermat number.

== Large primes ==
As of 2022, the largest known Proth prime is $10223 \times 2^{31172165} + 1$. It is 9,383,761 digits long. It was found by Szabolcs Peter in the PrimeGrid volunteer computing project which announced it on 6 November 2016. It is also the third largest known non-Mersenne prime.

The project Seventeen or Bust, searching for Proth primes with a certain $t$ to prove that 78557 is the smallest Sierpinski number (Sierpinski problem), has found 11 large Proth primes by 2007. Similar resolutions to the prime Sierpiński problem and extended Sierpiński problem have yielded several more numbers.

Since divisors of Fermat numbers $F_n = 2^{2^n} + 1$ are always of the form $k \times 2^{n+2} + 1$, it is customary to determine if a new Proth prime divides a Fermat number.

As of January 2025, PrimeGrid is the leading computing project for searching for Proth primes. Its main projects include:

- general Proth prime search
- 321 Prime Search (searching for primes of the form $3\times2^n+1$, also called Thabit primes of the second kind)
- 27121 Prime Search (searching for primes of the form $27\times2^n+1$ and $121\times2^n+1$)
- Cullen prime search (searching for primes of the form $n\times2^n+1$)
- Sierpinski problem (and their prime and extended generalizations) – searching for primes of the form $k \times 2^n+1$ where k is in this list:

k ∈ {21181, 22699, 24737, 55459, 67607, 79309, 79817, 91549, 99739, 131179, 152267, 156511, 163187, 200749, 209611, 222113, 225931, 227723, 229673, 237019, 238411}

As of June 2023, the largest Proth primes discovered are:

rank	prime	digits	when	Comments	Discoverer (Project)	References
1	10223 × 2^{31172165} + 1	9383761	31 Oct 2016		Szabolcs Péter (Sierpinski Problem)	
2	202705 × 2^{21320516} + 1	6418121	1 Dec 2021		Pavel Atnashev (Extended Sierpinski Problem)	
3	81 × 2^{20498148} + 1	6170560	13 Jul 2023	Generalized Fermat F_{2}(3 × 2^{5124537})	Ryan Propper (LLR)	
4	7 × 2^{20267500} + 1	6101127	21 Jul 2022	Divides F_{20267499}(12)	Ryan Propper (LLR)	
5	168451 × 2^{19375200} + 1	5832522	17 Sep 2017		Ben Maloney (Prime Sierpinski Problem)	
6	7 × 2^{18233956} + 1	5488969	1 Oct 2020	Divides Fermat F_{18233954} and F_{18233952}(7)	Ryan Propper	
7	13 × 2^{16828072} + 1	5065756	11 Oct 2023		Ryan Propper	
8	3 × 2^{16408818} + 1	4939547	28 Oct 2020	Divides F_{16408814}(3), F_{16408817}(5), and F_{16408815}(8)	James Brown (PrimeGrid)	
9	11 × 2^{15502315} + 1	4666663	8 Jan 2023	Divides F_{15502313}(10)	Ryan Propper	
10	37 × 2^{15474010} + 1	4658143	8 Nov 2022		Ryan Propper	
11	(2^{7658613} + 1) × 2^{7658614} + 1	4610945	31 Jul 2020	Gaussian Mersenne norm	Ryan Propper and Serge Batalov	
12	13 × 2^{15294536} + 1	4604116	30 Sep 2023		Ryan Propper	
13	37 × 2^{14166940} + 1	4264676	24 Jun 2022		Ryan Propper	
14	99739 × 2^{14019102} + 1	4220176	24 Dec 2019		Brian Niegocki (Extended Sierpinski Problem)	
15	404849 × 2^{13764867} + 1	4143644	10 Mar 2021	Generalized Cullen with base 131072	Ryan Propper and Serge Batalov	
16	25 × 2^{13719266} + 1	4129912	21 Sep 2022	F_{1}(5 × 2^{6859633})	Ryan Propper	
17	81 × 2^{13708272} + 1	4126603	11 Oct 2022	F_{2}(3 × 2^{3427068})	Ryan Propper	
18	81 × 2^{13470584} + 1	4055052	9 Oct 2022	F_{2}(3 × 2^{3367646})	Ryan Propper	
19	9 × 2^{13334487} + 1	4014082	31 Mar 2020	Divides F_{13334485}(3), F_{13334486}(7), and F_{13334484}(8)	Ryan Propper	
20	19249 × 2^{13018586} + 1	3918990	26 Mar 2007		Konstantin Agafonov (Seventeen or Bust)	

== Proth prime of the second kind ==
A Proth number of the second kind is a natural number N of the form $N = k \times 2^n-1$ where k and n are positive integers, k is odd and $2^n > k$. A Proth prime of the second kind is a Proth number of the second kind that is prime. The first few Proth primes of the second kind are

3, 7, 11, 23, 31, 47, 79, 127, 191, 223, 239, 383, 479, 607, 863, 991, 1087, 1151, 1279, 1471, 1663, 2111, 2239, 2687, 2879, 3391, 3583, 3967, 5119, 5503, 6143, 6271, 6911, 7039, 8191, 8447, 8831, 9343 (OEIS: A112715).

The largest Proth primes of the second kind, including Mersenne primes, can be tested for primality using the Lucas–Lehmer–Riesel test.

As of January 2025, PrimeGrid is the leading computing project for searching for Proth primes of the second kind. Its main projects include:

- general Proth prime of the second kind search
- 321 Prime Search (searching for primes of the form $3\times2^n-1$, also called Thabit primes)
- 27121 Prime Search (searching for primes of the form $27\times2^n-1$ and $121\times2^n-1$)
- Woodall prime search (searching for primes of the form $n\times2^n-1$)
- Riesel problem (and their prime and extended generalizations) – searching for primes of the form $k \times 2^n-1$ where k is in this list:

k ∈ {23669, 31859, 38473, 46663, 67117, 74699, 81041, 121889, 129007, 143047, 161669, 206231, 215443, 226153, 234343, 245561, 250027, 315929, 319511, 324011, 325123, 327671, 336839, 342847, 344759, 362609, 363343, 364903, 365159, 368411, 371893, 384539, 386801, 397027, 409753, 444637, 470173, 474491, 477583, 485557, 494743 }

== Uses ==
Small Proth primes (less than 10^{200}) have been used in constructing prime ladders, sequences of prime numbers such that each term is "close" (within about 10^{11}) to the previous one. Such ladders have been used to empirically verify prime-related conjectures. For example, Goldbach's weak conjecture was verified in 2008 up to 8.875 × 10^{30} using prime ladders constructed from Proth primes. (The conjecture was later proved by Harald Helfgott.)

Also, Proth primes can optimize den Boer reduction between the Diffie–Hellman problem and the Discrete logarithm problem. The prime number 55 × 2^{286} + 1 has been used in this way.

As Proth primes have simple binary representations, they have also been used in fast modular reduction without the need for pre-computation, for example by Microsoft.
