= LLR =

LLR may refer to:

- LLR 81mm, a type of mortar used by the French Army
- Lars Løkke Rasmussen, a Danish politician from Venstre, who served as prime minister 2009–2011 and again 2015–2019
- Lender of last resort, banking term
- Loan Loss Reserve, banking term
- Local Light Rum, a regional rum, freely available, predominantly found in tropical, sub-tropical locales
- Leukaemia & Lymphoma Research
- Lloyd's Law Reports
- Log-likelihood ratio
- Lucas–Lehmer–Riesel test, an algorithm to find the primality of a number of the form k*2^{n}-1
- Lunar laser ranging
- Link Light Rail, metro based in Seattle
