= Covering set =

In mathematics, a covering set for a sequence of integers refers to a set of prime numbers such that every term in the sequence is divisible by at least one member of the set. The term "covering set" is used only in conjunction with sequences possessing exponential growth.

== Sierpinski and Riesel numbers ==
The use of the term "covering set" is related to Sierpinski and Riesel numbers. These are odd natural numbers k for which the formula k 2^{n} + 1 (Sierpinski number) or k 2^{n} − 1 (Riesel number) produces no prime numbers. Since 1960 it has been known that there exists an infinite number of both Sierpinski and Riesel numbers (as solutions to families of congruences based upon the set {3, 5, 17, 257, 641, 65537, 6700417} (Note: These are of course the only known Fermat primes and the two prime factors of F_{5}.) but, because there are an infinitude of numbers of the form k 2^{n} + 1 or k 2^{n} − 1 for any k, one can only prove k to be a Sierpinski or Riesel number through showing that every term in the sequence k 2^{n} + 1 or k 2^{n} − 1 is divisible by one of the prime numbers of a covering set.

These covering sets form from prime numbers that in base 2 have short periods. To achieve a complete covering set, Wacław Sierpiński showed that a sequence can repeat no more frequently than every 24 numbers. A repeat every 24 numbers give the covering set {3, 5, 7, 13, 17, 241}, while a repeat every 36 terms can give several covering sets: {3, 5, 7, 13, 19, 37, 73}; {3, 5, 7, 13, 19, 37, 109}; {3, 5, 7, 13, 19, 73, 109} and {3, 5, 7, 13, 37, 73, 109}.

Riesel numbers have the same covering sets as Sierpinski numbers.

== Other covering sets ==
Covering sets (thus Sierpinski numbers and Riesel numbers) also exists for bases other than 2.

b	smallest k such that gcd(k+1, b−1) = 1 and k×b^{n}+1 has covering set	covering set for k×b^{n}+1	smallest k such that gcd(k−1, b−1) = 1 and k×b^{n}−1 has covering set	covering set for k×b^{n}−1
2	78557	{3, 5, 7, 13, 19, 37, 73}	509203	{3, 5, 7, 13, 17, 241}
3	125050976086	{5, 7, 13, 17, 19, 37, 41, 193, 757}	63064644938	{5, 7, 13, 17, 19, 37, 41, 193, 757}
4	66741	{5, 7, 13, 17, 241}	39939	{5, 7, 13, 19, 73, 109}
5	159986	{3, 7, 13, 31, 601}	346802	{3, 7, 13, 31, 601}
6	174308	{7, 13, 31, 37, 97}	84687	{7, 13, 31, 37, 97}
7	1112646039348	{5, 13, 19, 43, 73, 181, 193, 1201}	408034255082	{5, 13, 19, 43, 73, 181, 193, 1201}
8	47	{3, 5, 13}	14	{3, 5, 13}
9	2344	{5, 7, 13, 73}	74	{5, 7, 13, 73}
10	9175	{7, 11, 13, 37}	10176	{7, 11, 13, 37}
11	1490	{3, 7, 19, 37}	862	{3, 7, 19, 37}
12	521	{5, 13, 29}	376	{5, 13, 29}
13	132	{5, 7, 17}	302	{5, 7, 17}
14	4	{3, 5}	4	{3, 5}
15	91218919470156	{13, 17, 113, 211, 241, 1489, 3877}	36370321851498	{13, 17, 113, 211, 241, 1489, 3877}
16	66741	{7, 13, 17, 241}	33965	{7, 13, 17, 241}
17	278	{3, 5, 29}	86	{3, 5, 29}
18	398	{5, 13, 19}	246	{5, 13, 19}
19	765174	{5, 7, 13, 127, 769}	1119866	{5, 7, 13, 127, 181}
20	8	{3, 7}	8	{3, 7}

Covering sets are also used to prove the existence of composite generalized Fibonacci sequences with first two terms coprime (primefree sequence), such as the sequence starting with 20615674205555510 and 3794765361567513.

The concept of a covering set can easily be generalised to other sequences which turn out to be much simpler.

In the following examples + is used as it is in regular expressions to mean 1 or more. For example, 91^{+}3 means the set {913, 9113, 91113, 911113, …}.

An example are the following eight sequences:

- (29·10^{n} − 191) / 9 or 32^{+}01
- (37·10^{n} + 359) / 9 or 41^{+}51
- (46·10^{n} + 629) / 9 or 51^{+}81
- (59·10^{n} − 293) / 9 or 65^{+}23
- (82·10^{n} + 17) / 9 or 91^{+}3
- (85·10^{n} + 41) / 9 or 94^{+}9
- (86·10^{n} + 31) / 9 or 95^{+}9
- (89·10^{n} + 593) / 9 or 98^{+}23

In each case, every term is divisible by one of the primes from the set {3, 7, 11, 13}. These primes can be said to form a covering set exactly analogous to Sierpinski and Riesel numbers. The covering set {3, 7, 11, 37} is found for several similar sequences, including:

- (38·10^{n} − 137) / 9 or 42^{+}07
- (4·10^{n} − 337) / 9 or 4^{+}07
- (73·10^{n} + 359) / 9 or 81^{+}51
- 9175·10^{n} + 1 or 91750^{+}1
- 10176·10^{n} − 1 or 101759^{+}
- (334·10^{n} − 1)/9 or 371^{+}
- (12211·10^{n} − 1)/3 or 40703^{+}
- (8026·10^{n} − 7)/9 or 8917^{+}

Also for bases other than 10:

- 521·12^{n} + 1 or 3750^{+}1 in duodecimal
- (1288·12^{n} − 1)/11 or 991^{+} in duodecimal
- (4517·12^{n} − 7)/11 or 2X27^{+} in duodecimal
- 376·12^{n} − 1 or 273E^{+} in duodecimal

The covering set of them is {5, 13, 29}

An even simpler case can be found in the sequence:

- (76·10^{n} − 67) / 99 (n must be odd) or (76)^{+}7 (Sequence: 7, 767, 76767, 7676767, 767676767 etc.)

Here, it can be shown that if:

- w is of form 3k (n = 6k + 1): (76)^{+}7 is divisible by 7
- w is of form 3k + 1 (n = 6k + 3): (76)^{+}7 is divisible by 13
- w is of form 3k + 2 (n = 6k + 5): (76)^{+}7 is divisible by 3

Thus we have a covering set with only three primes {3, 7, 13}. This is only possible because the sequence gives integer terms only for odd n.

A covering set also occurs in the sequence:

- (343·10^{n} − 1) / 9 or 381^{+}.

Here, it can be shown that:

- If n = 3k + 1, then (343·10^{n} − 1) / 9 is divisible by 3.
- If n = 3k + 2, then (343·10^{n} − 1) / 9 is divisible by 37.
- If n = 3k, then (343·10^{n} − 1) / 9 algebraically factors as ((7·10^{k} − 1) / 3)·((49·10^{2k} + 7·10^{k} + 1) / 3).

Since (7·10^{k} − 1) / 3 can be written as 23^{+}, for the sequence 381^{+}, we have a covering set of {3, 37, 23^{+}} – a covering set with infinitely many terms.

The status for (343×10^{n} − 1)/9 is like that for 3511808×63^{n} + 1:

- If n = 3k + 1, then 3511808·63^{n} + 1 is divisible by 37.
- If n = 3k + 2, then 3511808·63^{n} + 1 is divisible by 109.
- If n = 3k, then 3511808·63^{n} + 1 algebraically factors as (152·63^{k} + 1)·(23104·63^{2k} − 152·63^{k} + 1)

Thus we have a covering of {37, 109, 152×63 + 1, 152×63^{2} + 1, 152×63^{3} + 1, ...} or {37, 109, 2Q0^{+}1 in base 63} – a covering set with infinitely many terms.

A more simple example is 4×9^{n} − 1, it is equal to (2×3^{n} − 1) × (2×3^{n} + 1), thus its covering sets are {5, 17, 53, 161, 485, ...} and {7, 19, 55, 163, 487, ...}, more generally, if k and b are both r-th powers for an odd r > 1, then k×b^{n} + 1 cannot be prime, and if k and b are both r-th powers for an r > 1 then k×b^{n} − 1 cannot be prime.

Another example is 1369×30^{n} − 1, its covering is {7, 13, 19, 37×30^{k} − 1 (k = 1, 2, 3, ...)}

== See also ==
- Covering system
