= Sierpiński number =

Integer with a specific property

In number theory, a Sierpiński number is an odd natural number k such that $k \times 2^n + 1$ is composite for all natural numbers n. In 1960, Wacław Sierpiński proved that there are infinitely many odd integers k which have this property.

In other words, when k is a Sierpiński number, all members of the following set are composite:

$$\left\{\, k \cdot 2^n + 1 : n \in\mathbb{N}\,\right\}.$$

If the form is instead $k \times 2^n - 1$, then k is a Riesel number.

== Known Sierpiński numbers ==
The sequence of currently known Sierpiński numbers begins with:

78557, 271129, 271577, 322523, 327739, 482719, 575041, 603713, 903983, 934909, 965431, 1259779, 1290677, 1518781, 1624097, 1639459, 1777613, 2131043, 2131099, 2191531, 2510177, 2541601, 2576089, 2931767, 2931991, ... (sequence A076336 in the OEIS).

The number 78557 was proved to be a Sierpiński number by John Selfridge in 1962 using the SWAC computer. In particular, he showed that all numbers of the form 78557⋅2^{n} + 1 have a factor in the covering set {3, 5, 7, 13, 19, 37, 73}. For another known Sierpiński number, 271129, the covering set is {3, 5, 7, 13, 17, 241}. Most currently known Sierpiński numbers possess similar covering sets.

However, in 1995 A. S. Izotov showed that some fourth powers could be proved to be Sierpiński numbers without establishing a covering set for all values of n. His proof depends on the aurifeuillean factorization t^{4}⋅2^{4m+2} + 1 = (t^{2}⋅2^{2m+1} + t⋅2^{m+1} + 1)⋅(t^{2}⋅2^{2m+1} − t⋅2^{m+1} + 1). This establishes that all n ≡ 2 (mod 4) give rise to a composite, and so it remains to eliminate only n ≡ 0, 1, 3 (mod 4) using a covering set.

== Smallest Sierpiński number ==
Unsolved problem in mathematics
Is 78,557 the smallest Sierpiński number?
More unsolved problems in mathematics

The integer 78557 is conjectured to be the smallest Sierpiński number. It was proved to be one by John Selfridge in 1962, who showed that all numbers of the form 78557⋅2^{n} + 1 have a factor in the covering set {3, 5, 7, 13, 19, 37, 73}. It is unknown whether 78557 is actually the smallest Sierpiński number. This is known as the Sierpiński problem.

To show that 78,557 really is the smallest Sierpiński number, one must show that all the odd numbers smaller than 78,557 are not Sierpiński numbers. That is, for every odd k below 78,557, there needs to exist a positive integer n such that k2^{n} + 1 is prime. The distributed volunteer computing project PrimeGrid is attempting to eliminate all the remaining values of k:

k = 21181, 22699, 24737, 55459, and 67607. (Note: See the current status for the remaining multipliers at PrimeGrid's website.)

In private correspondence with Paul Erdős, Selfridge conjectured that 78,557 was the smallest Sierpiński number. No smaller Sierpiński numbers have been discovered, and it is now believed that 78,557 is the smallest number.

== Smallest prime Sierpiński number ==
Unsolved problem in mathematics
Is 271,129 the smallest prime Sierpiński number?
More unsolved problems in mathematics

In 1976, Nathan Mendelsohn determined that the prime number 271,129 is a Sierpiński number. It is the second-smallest known Sierpiński number, and the smallest known prime Sierpiński number, but it is unknown whether others might be smaller. The prime Sierpiński problem asks for the value of the smallest prime Sierpiński number, and there is an ongoing "Prime Sierpiński search" which tries to prove that 271129 is the first Sierpiński number which is also a prime.

== Extended Sierpiński problem ==
Unsolved problem in mathematics
Is 271,129 the second Sierpiński number?
More unsolved problems in mathematics

Suppose that 78,557 is the smallest Sierpiński number and 271,129 is the smallest prime Sierpiński number. This leaves the second Sierpinski number unknown: there could exist a composite Sierpiński number between 78,557 and 271,129. An ongoing search is trying to prove that 271,129 is the second Sierpiński number by testing all integers in that range, prime or not.

== Simultaneously Sierpiński and Riesel ==
A number that is both Sierpiński and Riesel is a Brier number (after Éric Brier). The five smallest known examples are 3316923598096294713661, 10439679896374780276373, 11615103277955704975673, 12607110588854501953787, and 17855036657007596110949 (A076335); it is not known whether other Brier numbers smaller than these exist (i.e., they may not be the five smallest).

== See also ==
- Cullen number
- Proth number
- Woodall number
