= OProject@Home =

BOINC based volunteer computing project

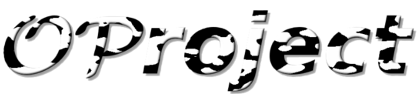

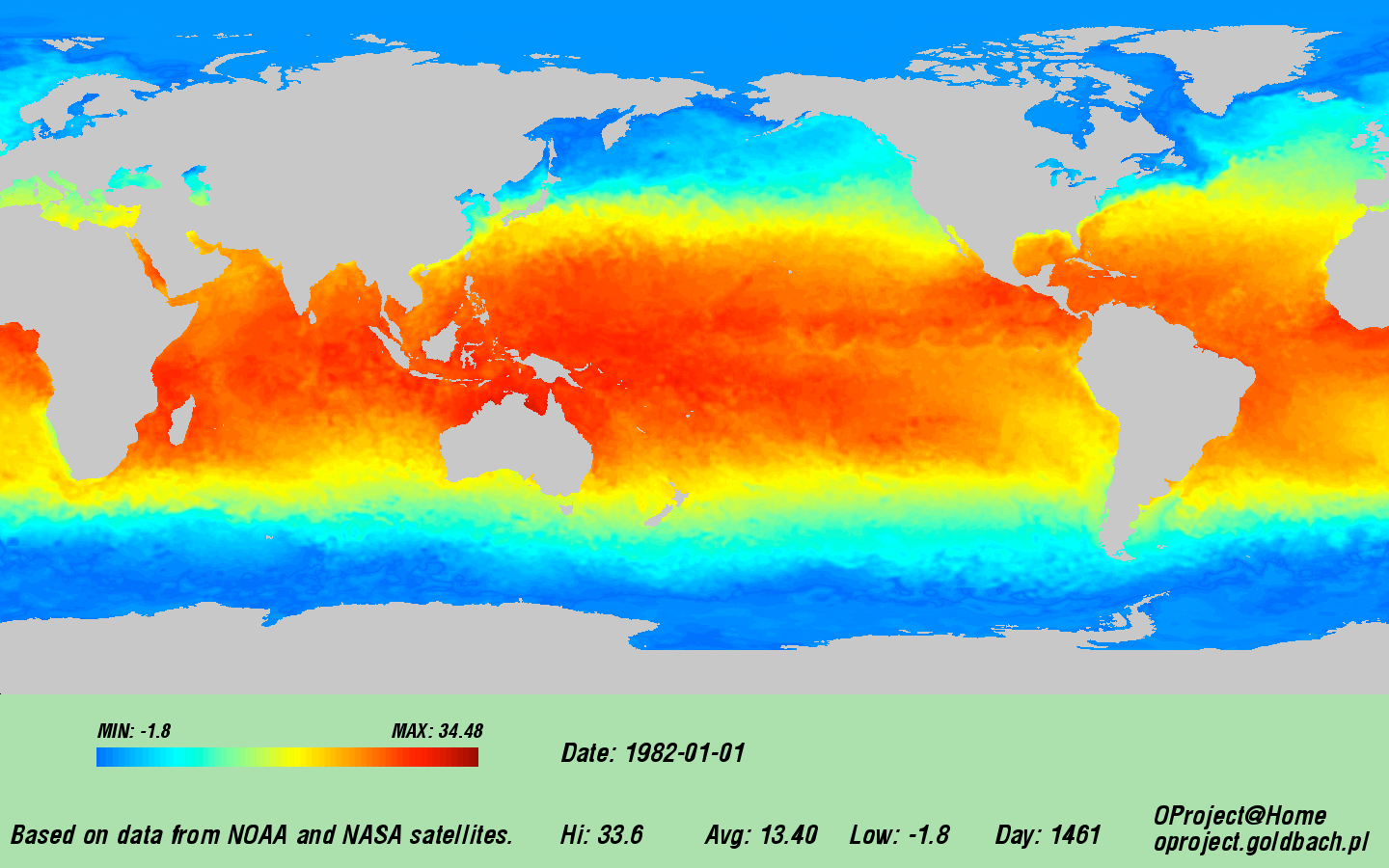
- Map of sea surface temperature of 1 January 1982 generated by OProject@Home
- Developer(s): Lukasz Swierczewski
- Initial release: August 13, 2012
- Development status: Inactive
- Written in: ANSI C / C++
- Operating system: Microsoft Windows, Linux, Mac OS X, Solaris, FreeBSD, Android
- Platform: Cross-platform (BOINC)
- Available in: English
- Average performance: 543.5 GFLOPS
- Total users: 2,243
- Total hosts: 1,778

OProject@Home was a volunteer computing project running on the Berkeley Open Infrastructure for Network Computing (BOINC) and was based on a dedicated library OLib. The project was directed by Lukasz Swierczewski, an IT student at the College of Computer Science and Business Administration in Łomża, Computer Science and Automation Institute. As of 2016 it seems to have been abandoned.

== Subprojects ==
- Shor's Algorithm
- Shor's Algorithm DP
- GSCE-SV
- ALX
- Weird Engine

Shor's Algorithm and Shor's Algorithm DP were the main subprojects of OProject@Home. The objective was to test quantum algorithms (e.g. Shor's algorithm) of quantum computing. GSCE-SV verifies the correctness of Goldbach's conjecture, while ALX is a Non-CPU-intensive (nci) subproject capable of running on ARM-based CPUs running Android or Linux. It is used to research and develop artificial intelligence and computer networks. The project supports the PlayStation 3.

The Weird Engine subproject calculates the weird numbers (sequence A006037 in the OEIS). Numbers are available in the project database. According to the OEIS it is the largest publicly available database of such numbers.

These ongoing work on the application analyzing status of water on Earth. OProject@Home uses data from NASA and NOAA satellites. Analyzed data are taken from devices AVHRR and AMSR that are used to measure the Earth's radiation predominantly in the infrared. Based on the information is easy to calculate the sea surface temperature and ice concentration at any point on Earth. This information will enable to perform the analysis and simulations climate.

The subprojects running on the platform OProject@Home are important to science because they address difficult and unsolved problems in physics and theoretical mathematics. For example, Goldbach's conjecture, proposed in 1742 has never been disproven. It is not even clear whether the problem can be solved, as the range of numbers are infinite. It's also not known if there are any odd weird numbers. All calculated weird numbers are even. Climate change and global warming has also raised a number of controversies, and a future goal is to effectively analyze the entire Earth to predict the probability of various possible threats to people. Such systems can warn against natural disasters such as hurricanes or cyclones that may arise in the future. Although this is a future development, a sample video showing the sea surface temperature for 1982 has been generated in order to show what this can result in. The simulation is based on publicly available databases from organisations such as NOAA and NASA.

As with other volunteer computing projects, progress relies on recruiting a number of users willing to donate computing power to the project. These projects are usually run in the background and when the computer is idle and have little or no performance impact when a person is using the computer.

A side effect of the project is to develop high-performance algorithms for the various subprojects. The source code of the programs are open and available for public download on Google Code, licensed under the GPL license. All the data generated by the project is also available from the project website, also distributed under the GPL license. The project is also open to new subprojects, although the current focus is on the continued development of the software, in order to ensure a more stable platform.

The project was officially launched on 13 August 2012. As of 9 October 2012, over 2243 volunteers with over 1779 hosts have participated in the project. OProject@Home has 9th place between all BOINC projects by the amount of new hosts after well-known WCG, SETI@Home, MilkyWay, Collatz conjecture, PrimeGrid projects. On 30 September 2012 the project lead released the news about the launch OProject@Home in BOINC official website, and later on the same day the project was added to the overall list of volunteer systems.
