= Fermat number =

Positive integer of the form (2^(2^n))+1

Fermat prime
- Named after: Pierre de Fermat
- No. of known terms: 5
- Conjectured no. of terms: 5
- Subsequence of: Fermat numbers
- First terms: 3, 5, 17, 257, 65537
- Largest known term: 65537
- OEIS index: A019434

In mathematics, a Fermat number, named after Pierre de Fermat (1601–1665), the first known to have studied them, is a positive integer of the form: $F_{n} = 2^{2^n} + 1,$ where n is a non-negative integer. The first few Fermat numbers are: 3, 5, 17, 257, 65537, 4294967297, 18446744073709551617, 340282366920938463463374607431768211457, ... (sequence A000215 in the OEIS).

If 2^{k} + 1 is prime and k > 0, then k itself must be a power of 2, so 2^{k} + 1 is a Fermat number; such primes are called Fermat primes. As of 2026, the only known Fermat primes are F_{0} = 3, F_{1} = 5, F_{2} = 17, F_{3} = 257, and F_{4} = 65537 (sequence A019434 in the OEIS).

== Basic properties ==
The Fermat numbers satisfy the following recurrence relations:

$$F_{n} = (F_{n-1}-1)^{2}+1$$

$$F_{n} = F_{0} F_{1} \cdots F_{n-1} + 2$$

for n ≥ 1,

$$F_{n} = F_{n-1} + 2^{2^{n-1}}F_{0} F_{1} \cdots F_{n-2}$$

$$F_{n} = (F_{n-1} - 2F_{n-2} + 1)^2 + (2(F_{n-2} - 2)(F_{n-3} - 1))^2 + (2F_{n-2} - 3)^2$$

$$F_{n} = F_{n-1}^2 - 2(F_{n-2}-1)^2$$

for n ≥ 2. Each of these relations can be proved by mathematical induction. From the second equation, we can deduce Goldbach's theorem (named after Christian Goldbach): no two Fermat numbers share a common integer factor greater than 1. To see this, suppose that 0 ≤ i < j and F_{i} and F_{j} have a common factor a > 1. Then a divides both

$$F_{0} F_{1} \cdots F_{j-1}$$

and F_{j}; hence a divides their difference, 2. Since a > 1, this forces a = 2. This is a contradiction, because each Fermat number is clearly odd. As a corollary, we obtain another proof of the infinitude of the prime numbers: for each F_{n}, choose a prime factor p_{n}; then the sequence {p_{n}} is an infinite sequence of distinct primes.

=== Further properties ===
- No Fermat prime can be expressed as the difference of two pth powers, where p is an odd prime.
- With the exception of F_{0} and F_{1}, the last decimal digit of a Fermat number is 7.
- The sum of the reciprocals of all the Fermat numbers (sequence A051158 in the OEIS) is irrational. (Solomon W. Golomb, 1963)

== Primality ==
Fermat numbers and Fermat primes were first studied by Pierre de Fermat, who conjectured that all Fermat numbers are prime. Indeed, the first five Fermat numbers F_{0}, ..., F_{4} are easily shown to be prime. Fermat's conjecture was refuted by Leonhard Euler in 1732 when he showed, by dividing by 641 that

$$F_{5} = 2^{2^5} + 1 = 2^{32} + 1 = 4294967297 = 641 \times 6700417$$

Euler proved that every factor of F_{n} must have the form k 2^{n+1} + 1 (later improved to k 2^{n+2} + 1 by Lucas) for n ≥ 2.

That 641 is a factor of F_{5} can be deduced, in hindsight, as follows: From the equalities 641 = 2^{7} × 5 + 1 and 641 = 2^{4} + 5^{4}. It follows from the first equality that 2^{7} × 5 ≡ −1 (mod 641) and therefore (raising to the fourth power) that 2^{28} × 5^{4} ≡ 1 (mod 641). On the other hand, the second equality implies that 5^{4} ≡ −2^{4} (mod 641). These congruences imply that 2^{32} ≡ −1 (mod 641).

Fermat was probably aware of the form of the factors later proved by Euler, so it seems curious that he failed to follow through on the straightforward calculation to find the factor. One common explanation is that Fermat made a computational mistake.

There are no other known Fermat primes F_{n} with n > 4, but little is known about Fermat numbers for large n. In fact, each of the following is an open problem:

- Is F_{n} composite for all n > 4?
- Are there infinitely many Fermat primes? (Eisenstein 1844)
- Are there infinitely many composite Fermat numbers?
- Does a Fermat number exist that is not square-free?

As of December 2025, it is known that F_{n} is composite for 5 ≤ n ≤ 32, although of these, complete factorizations of F_{n} are known only for 0 ≤ n ≤ 11, and there are no known prime factors for n = 20 and n = 24. The largest Fermat number known to be composite is F_{18233954}, and its prime factor 7 × 2^{18233956} + 1 was discovered in October 2020.

=== Heuristic arguments ===
Heuristics suggest that F_{4} is the last Fermat prime.

The prime number theorem implies that a random integer in a suitable interval around N is prime with probability 1 / ln N. If one uses the heuristic that a Fermat number is prime with the same probability as a random integer of its size, and that F_{5}, ..., F_{32} are composite, then the expected number of Fermat primes beyond F_{4} (or equivalently, beyond F_{32}) should be

$$\sum_{n \ge 33} \frac{1}{\ln F_{n}} < \frac{1}{\ln 2} \sum_{n \ge 33} \frac{1}{\log_2(2^{2^n})} = \frac{1}{\ln 2} 2^{-32} < 3.36 \times 10^{-10}.$$

One may interpret this number as an upper bound for the probability that a Fermat prime beyond F_{4} exists.

This argument is not a rigorous proof. For one thing, it assumes that Fermat numbers behave "randomly", but the factors of Fermat numbers have special properties. Boklan and Conway published a more precise analysis suggesting that the probability that there is another Fermat prime is less than one in a billion.

Anders Bjorn and Hans Riesel estimated the number of square factors of Fermat numbers from F_{5} onward as

$$\sum_{n \ge 5} \sum_{k \ge 1} \frac{1}{k (k 2^n + 1) \ln(k 2^n)} < \frac{\pi^2}{6 \ln 2} \sum_{n \ge 5} \frac{1}{n 2^n} \approx 0.02576;$$

in other words, there are unlikely to be any non-squarefree Fermat numbers, and in general square factors of $a^{2^n} + b^{2^n}$ are very rare for large n.

=== Equivalent conditions ===
Let $F_n=2^{2^n}+1$ be the nth Fermat number. Pépin's test states that for n > 0,

$F_n$ is prime if and only if $3^{(F_n-1)/2}\equiv-1\pmod{F_n}.$

The expression $3^{(F_n-1)/2}$ can be evaluated modulo $F_n$ by repeated squaring. This makes the test a fast polynomial-time algorithm. But Fermat numbers grow so rapidly that only a handful of them can be tested in a reasonable amount of time and space.

There are some tests for numbers of the form k 2^{m} + 1, such as factors of Fermat numbers, for primality.

Proth's theorem (1878). Let N = k 2^{m} + 1 with odd k < 2^{m}. If there is an integer a such that

$$a^{(N-1)/2} \equiv -1\pmod{N}$$

then $N$ is prime. Conversely, if the above congruence does not hold, and in addition

$\left(\frac{a}{N}\right)=-1$ (See Jacobi symbol)

then $N$ is composite.

If N = F_{n} > 3, then the above Jacobi symbol is always equal to −1 for a = 3, and this special case of Proth's theorem is known as Pépin's test. Although Pépin's test and Proth's theorem have been implemented on computers to prove the compositeness of some Fermat numbers, neither test gives a specific nontrivial factor. In fact, no specific prime factors are known for n = 20 and 24.

== Factorization ==
Because of Fermat numbers' size, it is difficult to factorize or even to check primality. Pépin's test gives a necessary and sufficient condition for primality of Fermat numbers, and can be implemented by modern computers. The elliptic curve method is a fast method for finding small prime divisors of numbers. Distributed computing project Fermatsearch has found some factors of Fermat numbers. Yves Gallot's proth.exe has been used to find factors of large Fermat numbers. Édouard Lucas, improving Euler's above-mentioned result, proved in 1878 that every factor of the Fermat number $F_n$, with n at least 2, is of the form $k\times2^{n+2}+1$ (see Proth number), where k is a positive integer. By itself, this makes it easy to prove the primality of the known Fermat primes.

Factorizations of the first 12 Fermat numbers are:

| F_{0} | = | 2^{1} | + | 1 | = | 3 is prime |
| F_{1} | = | 2^{2} | + | 1 | = | 5 is prime |
| F_{2} | = | 2^{4} | + | 1 | = | 17 is prime |
| F_{3} | = | 2^{8} | + | 1 | = | 257 is prime |
| F_{4} | = | 2^{16} | + | 1 | = | 65,537 is the largest known Fermat prime |
| F_{5} | = | 2^{32} | + | 1 | = | 4,294,967,297 |
| | | | | | = | 641 × 6,700,417 (fully factored 1732) |
| F_{6} | = | 2^{64} | + | 1 | = | 18,446,744,073,709,551,617 (20 digits) |
| | | | | | = | 274,177 × 67,280,421,310,721 (14 digits) (fully factored 1855) |
| F_{7} | = | 2^{128} | + | 1 | = | 340,282,366,920,938,463,463,374,607,431,768,211,457 (39 digits) |
| | | | | | = | 59,649,589,127,497,217 (17 digits) × 5,704,689,200,685,129,054,721 (22 digits) (fully factored 1970) |
| F_{8} | = | 2^{256} | + | 1 | = | 115,792,089,237,316,195,423,570,985,008,687,907,853,269,984,665,640,564,039,457,584,007,913,129, 639,937 (78 digits) |
| | | | | | = | 1,238,926,361,552,897 (16 digits) × 93,461,639,715,357,977,769,163,558,199,606,896,584,051,237,541,638,188,580,280,321 (62 digits) (fully factored 1980) |
| F_{9} | = | 2^{512} | + | 1 | = | 13,407,807,929,942,597,099,574,024,998,205,846,127,479,365,820,592,393,377,723,561,443,721,764,0; 30,073,546,976,801,874,298,166,903,427,690,031,858,186,486,050,853,753,882,811,946,569,946,433,6; 49,006,084,097 (155 digits) |
| | | | | | = | 2,424,833 × 7,455,602,825,647,884,208,337,395,736,200,454,918,783,366,342,657 (49 digits) × 741,640,062,627,530,801,524,787,141,901,937,474,059,940,781,097,519,023,905,821,316,144,415,759, 504,705,008,092,818,711,693,940,737 (99 digits) (fully factored 1990) |
| F_{10} | = | 2^{1024} | + | 1 | = | 179,769,313,486,231,590,772,930...304,835,356,329,624,224,137,217 (309 digits) |
| | | | | | = | 45,592,577 × 6,487,031,809 × 4,659,775,785,220,018,543,264,560,743,076,778,192,897 (40 digits) × 130,439,874,405,488,189,727,484...806,217,820,753,127,014,424,577 (252 digits) (fully factored 1995) |
| F_{11} | = | 2^{2048} | + | 1 | = | 32,317,006,071,311,007,300,714,8...193,555,853,611,059,596,230,657 (617 digits) |
| | | | | | = | 319,489 × 974,849 × 167,988,556,341,760,475,137 (21 digits) × 3,560,841,906,445,833,920,513 (22 digits) × 173,462,447,179,147,555,430,258...491,382,441,723,306,598,834,177 (564 digits) (fully factored 1988) |

As of January 2025, only F_{0} to F_{11} have been completely factored. The distributed computing project Fermat Search is searching for new factors of Fermat numbers. The set of all Fermat factors is A050922 (or, sorted, A023394) in OEIS.

The following factors of Fermat numbers were known before 1950 (since then, digital computers have helped find more factors):

| Year | Finder | Fermat number | Factor |
|---|---|---|---|
| 1732 | Euler | $F_5$ | $5 \cdot 2^7 + 1$ |
| 1732 | Euler | $F_5$ (fully factored) | $52347 \cdot 2^7 + 1$ |
| 1855 | Clausen | $F_6$ | $1071 \cdot 2^8 + 1$ |
| 1855 | Clausen | $F_6$ (fully factored) | $262814145745 \cdot 2^8 + 1$ |
| 1877 | Pervushin | $F_{12}$ | $7 \cdot 2^{14} + 1$ |
| 1878 | Pervushin | $F_{23}$ | $5 \cdot 2^{25} + 1$ |
| 1886 | Seelhoff | $F_{36}$ | $5 \cdot 2^{39} + 1$ |
| 1899 | Cunningham | $F_{11}$ | $39 \cdot 2^{13} + 1$ |
| 1899 | Cunningham | $F_{11}$ | $119 \cdot 2^{13} + 1$ |
| 1903 | Western | $F_9$ | $37 \cdot 2^{16} + 1$ |
| 1903 | Western | $F_{12}$ | $397 \cdot 2^{16} + 1$ |
| 1903 | Western | $F_{12}$ | $973 \cdot 2^{16} + 1$ |
| 1903 | Western | $F_{18}$ | $13 \cdot 2^{20} + 1$ |
| 1903 | Cullen | $F_{38}$ | $3 \cdot 2^{41} + 1$ |
| 1906 | Morehead | $F_{73}$ | $5 \cdot 2^{75} + 1$ |
| 1925 | Kraitchik | $F_{15}$ | $579 \cdot 2^{21} + 1$ |

As of December 2025, 375 prime factors of Fermat numbers are known, and 330 Fermat numbers are known to be composite. Several new Fermat factors are found each year.

== Pseudoprimes and Fermat numbers ==
Like composite numbers of the form 2^{p} − 1, every composite Fermat number is a strong pseudoprime to base 2. This is because all strong pseudoprimes to base 2 are also Fermat pseudoprimes – i.e.,

$$2^{F_n-1} \equiv 1 \pmod{F_n}$$

for all Fermat numbers.

In 1904, Cipolla showed that the product of at least two distinct prime or composite Fermat numbers $F_{a} F_{b} \dots F_{s},$ $a > b > \dots > s > 1$ will be a Fermat pseudoprime to base 2 if and only if $2^s > a$.

== Other theorems about Fermat numbers ==
A Fermat number cannot be a perfect number or part of a pair of amicable numbers. (Luca 2000)

The series of reciprocals of all prime divisors of Fermat numbers is convergent. (Křížek, Luca & Somer 2002)

If n^{n} + 1 is prime and $n \ge 2$, there exists an integer m such that n = 2^{2^{m}}. The equation n^{n} + 1 = F_{(2^{m}+m)} holds in that case.

Let the largest prime factor of the Fermat number F_{n} be P(F_{n}). Then,

$P(F_n) \ge 2^{n+2}(4n+9) + 1.$ (Grytczuk, Luca & Wójtowicz 2001)

== Relationship to constructible polygons ==
Number of sides of known constructible polygons having up to 1000 sides (bold) or odd side count (red)

Carl Friedrich Gauss developed the theory of Gaussian periods in his Disquisitiones Arithmeticae and formulated a sufficient condition for the constructibility of regular polygons. Gauss stated that this condition was also necessary, but never published a proof. Pierre Wantzel gave a full proof of necessity in 1837. The result is known as the Gauss–Wantzel theorem:

An n-sided regular polygon can be constructed with compass and straightedge if and only if n is the product of a power of 2 and distinct Fermat primes: in other words, if and only if n is of the form n = 2^{k}p_{1}p_{2}...p_{s}, where k, s are nonnegative integers and the p_{i} are distinct Fermat primes.

A positive integer n is of the above form if and only if its totient φ(n) is a power of 2.

== Applications of Fermat numbers ==
=== Pseudorandom number generation ===
Fermat primes are particularly useful in generating pseudo-random sequences of numbers in the range 1, ..., N, where N is a power of 2. The most common method used is to take any seed value between 1 and P − 1, where P is a Fermat prime. Now multiply this by a number A, which is greater than the square root of P and is a primitive root modulo P (i.e., it is not a quadratic residue). Then take the result modulo P. The result is the new value for the RNG.

$V_{j+1} = (A \times V_j) \bmod P$ (see linear congruential generator)

This is useful in computer science, since most data structures have members with 2^{X} possible values. For example, a byte has 256 (2^{8}) possible values (0–255). Therefore, to fill a byte or bytes with random values, a random number generator that produces values 1–256 can be used, the byte taking the output value −1. Very large Fermat primes are of particular interest in data encryption for this reason. This method produces only pseudorandom values, as after P − 1 repetitions, the sequence repeats. A poorly chosen multiplier can result in the sequence repeating sooner than P − 1.

== Generalized Fermat numbers ==
Numbers of the form $\frac{a^{2^n}+b^{2^n}}{gcd(a+b,2)}$ with a, b any coprime integers, a > b > 0, are called generalized Fermat numbers. An odd prime p is a generalized Fermat number if and only if p is congruent to 1 (mod 4). (Here we consider only the case n > 0, so 3 = $2^{2^{0}} \!+ 1$ is not a counterexample.)

An example of a probable prime of this form is 200^{262144} + 119^{262144} (found by Kellen Shenton).

By analogy with the ordinary Fermat numbers, it is common to write generalized Fermat numbers of the form $a^{2^{ \overset{n} {}}} \!\!+ 1$ as F_{n}(a). In this notation, for instance, the number 100,000,001 would be written as F_{3}(10). In the following we shall restrict ourselves to primes of this form, $a^{2^{ \overset{n} {}}} \!\!+ 1$, such primes are called "Fermat primes base a". Of course, these primes exist only if a is even.

=== Largest known generalized Fermat primes ===
The following is a list of the ten largest known generalized Fermat primes. The whole top-10 is discovered by participants in the PrimeGrid project.

| Rank | Prime number | Generalized Fermat notation | Number of digits | Discovery date | Ref. |
|---|---|---|---|---|---|
| 1 | 2524190^{2097152} + 1 | F_{21}(2524190) | 13,426,224 | Oct 2025 | |
| 2 | 4×5^{11786358} + 1 | F_{1}(2×5^{5893179}) | 8,238,312 | Oct 2024 | |
| 3 | 7172162^{1048576}+1 | F_{20}(7172162) | 7,188,671 | Aug 2026 | |
| 4 | 5336284^{1048576} + 1 | F_{20}(5336284) | 7,054,022 | Nov 2025 | |
| 5 | 3843236^{1048576} + 1 | F_{20}(3843236) | 6,904,556 | Dec 2024 | |
| 6 | 1963736^{1048576} + 1 | F_{20}(1963736) | 6,598,776 | Sep 2022 | |
| 7 | 1951734^{1048576} + 1 | F_{20}(1951734) | 6,595,985 | Aug 2022 | |
| 8 | 1059094^{1048576} + 1 | F_{20}(1059094) | 6,317,602 | Nov 2018 | |
| 9 | 919444^{1048576} + 1 | F_{20}(919444) | 6,253,210 | Sep 2017 | |
| 10 | 81×2^{20498148} + 1 | F_{2}(3×2^{5124537}) | 6,170,560 | Jun 2023 | |

On the Prime Pages one can find the current top 20 generalized Fermat primes and the current top 100 generalized Fermat primes.

== See also ==
- Constructible polygon: which regular polygons are constructible partially depends on Fermat primes.
- Double exponential function
- Lucas' theorem
- Mersenne prime
- Pierpont prime
- Primality test
- Proth's theorem
- Pseudoprime
- Sierpiński number
- Sylvester's sequence
