= Éric Brier =

French cryptographer

Éric Brier is a French cryptographer whose surname has been given to the Brier number and, acronymically with his colleagues Thomas Peyrin and Jacques Stern, the (since deprecated) Format-preserving encryption standard BPS, more formally known as FFP3. He has also given his name to the Brier-Joye ladder.

He has worked for the French military procurement agency DGA, at Gemplus in the field of smart cards as a white-hat hacker, and similarly at Gemalto and Ingenico. He has been employed at the Thales Group since July 2020, working largely on quantum cryptography and NIST Post-Quantum Cryptography Standardization As Chief Technology Officer his team's signature-signing scheme Falcon was selected as a standard under the aegis of NIST after a rigorous six-year competition

His educational career is as follows:

École Polytechnique Engineer (Physics, Mathematics)

1992—1995 Aix-Marseille University DEA (Discrete Mathematics)

2001—2002 ENSTA Paris Engineer (Physics, Computer Science)

1995—1997 Classe préparatoire Nancy 1990

The author of 48 papers, Brier's h-index is 12.

He is based in Gennevilliers, France.
