= Twin Prime Search =

Volunteer computing project seeking large twin primes

Twin Prime Search (TPS) is a volunteer computing project that looks for large twin primes. It uses the programs LLR (for primality testing) and NewPGen (for sieving). It was founded on April 13, 2006, by Michael Kwok. In number theory, it is conjectured that there are infinitely many twin primes, and this is known as the twin prime conjecture.

== Progress ==
TPS found a record twin prime, 2003663613 × 2^{195000} ± 1, on January 15, 2007, on a computer operated by Eric Vautier. It is 58,711 digits long, which made it the largest known twin prime at the time. The project worked in collaboration with PrimeGrid, which did most of the LLR tests.

On August 6, 2009, those same two projects announced that a new record twin prime had been found. The primes are 65516468355 × 2^{333333} ± 1, and have 100,355 digits.

On December 25, 2011, Timothy D Winslow found the world's largest known twin primes 3756801695685 × 2^{666669} ± 1.

As of February 2024, the current largest twin prime pair known is 2996863034895 · 2^{1290000} ± 1, with 388,342 decimal digits. It was discovered on September 14, 2016.

== Current efforts ==
TPS has two subprojects as of 2024. These subprojects include a variable twin search to find twins between 144,500 and 150,500 digits, and a search called the "Operation Megabit Twin" for primes larger than k × 2^{1,000,000} ± 1.

== See also ==
- List of volunteer computing projects
- PrimeGrid
