= Hans Riesel =

Swedish mathematician (1929–2014)

Hans Ivar Riesel (28 May 1929 in Stockholm – 21 December 2014) was a Swedish mathematician who discovered the 18th Mersenne prime in 1957 using the computer BESK: 2^{3217}-1, comprising 969 digits. He held the record for the largest known prime from 1957 to 1961, when Alexander Hurwitz discovered a larger one. Riesel also discovered the Riesel numbers as well as developing the Lucas–Lehmer–Riesel test. After having worked at the Swedish Board for Computing Machinery, he was awarded his Ph.D. from Stockholm University in 1969 for his thesis Contributions to numerical number theory, and in the same year joined the Royal Institute of Technology as a senior lecturer and associate professor.

== Career and research ==
After completing an engineering degree at Kungliga Tekniska högskolan (KTH) in 1953, Riesel joined the state-run BESK computer project. Using nights and weekends on the machine he coded a self-checking Lucas–Lehmer routine in machine language, feeding exponents from punched paper tape; on 24 September 1957 the program halted with a zero residue for p = 3,217, identifying 2^{3217} − 1 (969 digits) as the largest known prime of the day.

Intrigued by numbers that resist such searches, he proved in 1956 that there exist odd integers k for which k·2ⁿ − 1 is composite for every n ≥ 1, inaugurating the study of what are now called Riesel numbers. He later generalised the Lucas–Lehmer test to these sequences, publishing the Lucas–Lehmer–Riesel test in 1981; this test remains the work-horse algorithm for the PrimeGrid distributed-computing project.

Appointed senior lecturer at KTH in 1969, Riesel launched Sweden's first graduate course on computational number theory and supervised nine PhD theses on fast modular arithmetic and discrete logarithms. His monograph Prime Numbers and Computer Methods for Factorization (Birkhäuser, 1985; 2nd ed. 1994) synthesised that course and became a standard reference for early RSA cryptosystem implementers. Outside academia he co-founded the non-profit Stockholm Computer Association, promoting open access to idle mainframe time for scientific projects. He retired in 1994 but continued to maintain the Riesel Sieve webpages, coordinating a volunteer effort that has eliminated all but ten candidate Riesel numbers below 10,000.

== Selected publications ==
- Riesel, Hans (1994). Prime Numbers and Computer Methods for factorization. Progress in Mathematics. Vol. 126 (2nd ed.). Boston, MA: Birkhäuser. ISBN 0-8176-3743-5. Zbl 0821.11001.
