= Lucas–Lehmer–Riesel test =

Primality test for certain numbers

In mathematics, the Lucas–Lehmer–Riesel test is a primality test for numbers of the form N = k · 2^{n} − 1 with odd k < 2^{n}. The test was developed by Hans Riesel and it is based on the Lucas–Lehmer primality test. It is the fastest deterministic algorithm known for numbers of that form. For numbers of the form N = k · 2^{n} + 1 (Proth numbers), either application of Proth's theorem (a Las Vegas algorithm) or one of the deterministic proofs described in Brillhart–Lehmer–Selfridge 1975 (see Pocklington primality test) are used.

== The algorithm ==
The algorithm is very similar to the Lucas–Lehmer test, but with a variable starting point depending on the value of k.

Define a sequence u_{i} for all i > 0 by:

$$u_i = u_{i-1}^2-2.$$

Then N = k · 2^{n} − 1, with k < 2^{n}, is prime if and only if it divides u_{n−2}.

== Finding the starting value ==
The starting value u_{0} is determined as follows.

- If k ≡ 1 or 5 (mod 6): if 1 (mod 6) and n is even, or 5 (mod 6) and n is odd, then 3 divides N, and there is no need to test. Otherwise, N ≡ 7 (mod 24) and the Lucas sequence V(4,1) may be used: we take $u_0 = (2+\sqrt{3})^k+(2-\sqrt{3})^k$, which is the kth term of that sequence. This is a generalization of the ordinary Lucas–Lehmer test, and reduces to it when k = 1.
- Otherwise, we are in the case where k is a multiple of 3, and it is more difficult to select the right value of u_{0}. It is known that if k = 3 and n ≡ 0 or 3 (mod 4), then we can take u_{0} = 5778.

An alternative method for finding the starting value u_{0} is given in Rödseth 1994. The selection method is much easier than that used by Riesel for the 3-divides-k case: first, find a P-value that satisfies the following equalities of Jacobi symbols:

$$\left(\frac{P-2}{N}\right)=1 \quad\text{and}\quad \left(\frac{P+2}{N}\right)=-1.$$

In practice, only a few P-values need be checked before one is found (5, 8, 9, or 11 work in about 85% of trials).

To find the starting value u_{0} from the P value, we can use a Lucas (P,1) sequence, as shown in Rödseth 1994 as well as page 124 of Riesel 1994. The latter explains that when 3 ∤ k, P = 4 may be used as above, and no further search is necessary.

The starting value u_{0} will be the Lucas sequence term V_{k}(P,1) taken modulo N. This process of selection takes very little time compared to the main test.

== How the test works ==
The Lucas–Lehmer–Riesel test is a particular case of group-order primality testing; we demonstrate that some number is prime by showing that some group has the order that it would have were that number prime, and we do this by finding an element of that group of precisely the right order.

For Lucas-style tests on a number N, we work in the multiplicative group of a quadratic extension of the integers modulo N; if N is prime, then the order of this multiplicative group is N^{2} − 1, it has a subgroup of order N + 1, and we try to find a generator for that subgroup.

We start off by trying to find a non-iterative expression for the u_{i}. Following the model of the Lucas–Lehmer test, put u_{i} = a^{2^{i}} + a^{−2^{i}}, and by induction we have u_{i} = u^{2}_{i−1} − 2.

So we can consider ourselves as looking at the 2^{i}th term of the sequence v(i) = a^{i} + a^{i}. If a satisfies a quadratic equation, then this is a Lucas sequence, and has an expression of the form v(i) = α v(i−1) + β v(i−2). Really, we are looking at the k · 2^{i}th term of a different sequence, but since decimations (take every kth term starting with the zeroth) of a Lucas sequence are themselves Lucas sequences, we can deal with the factor k by picking a different starting point.

== LLR software ==
LLR is a program that can run the LLR tests. The program was developed by Jean Penné. Vincent Penné has modified the program so that it can obtain tests via the Internet. The software is used by both individual prime searchers and some distributed computing projects including Riesel Sieve and PrimeGrid.

A version revised by Pavel Atnashev, LLR2, was deployed in 2020. This generates a Gerbicz-Pietrzak "proof of work" certificate for the Fermat and Proth tests which allows the computation to be verified without needing a full double-check. The cost is a 35% slowdown in computation and a lack of definiteness of any positive result as these verifiable tests are probabilistic.

A further update from Atnashev, PRST of 2023 uses an alternate Gerbicz-Li certificate scheme which takes about 2× longer to verify but has virtually no speed penalty for the main computation. The new proof scheme also applies to the Morrison test, a generalization of the LLR test with Rödseth starting value. However, generating a proof-enabled LLR/Morrison is slower than running a plain LLR/Morrison, as the proof process requires both the U and V Lucas sequences (as opposed to the plain test only requiring the V-sequence after some modification: check that $V_{k\cdot (N+1)/2} \equiv 0 \pmod N$ for $Q = -1$).

== See also ==
- Riesel number
