= Cullen number =

Mathematical concept

In mathematics, a Cullen number is a member of the integer sequence $C_n = n \cdot 2^n + 1$ (where $n$ is a natural number). Cullen numbers were first studied by Irish mathematician James Cullen in 1905. The numbers are special cases of Proth numbers.

== Properties ==
In 1976 Christopher Hooley showed that the natural density of positive integers $n \leq x$ for which C_{n} is a prime is of the order o(x) for $x \to \infty$. In that sense, almost all Cullen numbers are composite. Hooley's proof was reworked by Hiromi Suyama to show that it works for any sequence of numbers n·2^{n + a} + b where a and b are integers, and in particular also for Woodall numbers. The only known Cullen primes, sixteen in all, are those for n equal to:

1, 141, 4713, 5795, 6611, 18496, 32292, 32469, 59656, 90825, 262419, 361275, 481899, 1354828, 6328548, 6679881 (sequence A005849 in the OEIS).

Still, it is conjectured that there are infinitely many Cullen primes.

A Cullen number C_{n} is divisible by p = 2n − 1 if p is a prime number of the form 8k − 3; furthermore, it follows from Fermat's little theorem that if p is an odd prime, then p divides C_{m(k)} for each m(k) = (2^{k} − k) (p − 1) − k (for k > 0). It has also been shown that the prime number p divides C_{(p + 1)/2} when the Jacobi symbol (2 | p) is −1, and that p divides C_{(3p − 1)/2} when the Jacobi symbol (2 | p) is + 1.

It is unknown whether there exists a prime number p such that C_{p} is also prime.

C_{n} follows the recurrence relation

$$C_n=4(C_{n-1}-C_{n-2})+1$$.

== Generalizations ==
Sometimes, a generalized Cullen number base b is defined to be a number of the form n·b^{n} + 1, where n + 2 > b; if a prime can be written in this form, it is then called a generalized Cullen prime. Woodall numbers are sometimes called Cullen numbers of the second kind.

As of April 2025, the largest known generalized Cullen prime is 4052186·69^{4052186} + 1. It has 7,451,366 digits and was discovered by a PrimeGrid participant.

According to Fermat's little theorem, if there is a prime p such that n is divisible by p − 1 and n + 1 is divisible by p (especially, when n = p − 1) and p does not divide b, then b^{n} must be congruent to 1 mod p (since b^{n} is a power of b^{p − 1} and b^{p − 1} is congruent to 1 mod p). Thus, n·b^{n} + 1 is divisible by p, so it is not prime. For example, if some n congruent to 2 mod 6 (i.e. 2, 8, 14, 20, 26, 32, ...), n·b^{n} + 1 is prime, then b must be divisible by 3 (except b = 1).

The least n such that n·b^{n} + 1 is prime (with question marks if this term is currently unknown) are

1, 1, 2, 1, 1242, 1, 34, 5, 2, 1, 10, 1, ?, 3, 8, 1, 19650, 1, 6460, 3, 2, 1, 4330, 2, 2805222, 117, 2, 1, ?, 1, 82960, 5, 2, 25, 304, 1, 36, 3, 368, 1, 1806676, 1, 390, 53, 2, 1, ?, 3, ?, 9665, 62, 1, 1341174, 3, ?, 1072, 234, 1, 220, 1, 142, 1295, 8, 3, 16990, 1, 474, 129897, 4052186, 1, 13948, 1, 2525532, 3, 2, 1161, 12198, 1, 682156, 5, 350, 1, 1242, 26, 186, 3, 2, 1, 298, 14, 101670, 9, 2, 775, 202, 1, 1374, 63, 2, 1, ... (sequence A240234 in the OEIS)

b	Numbers n such that n × b^{n} + 1 is prime	OEIS sequence
3	2, 8, 32, 54, 114, 414, 1400, 1850, 2848, 4874, 7268, 19290, 337590, 1183414, ...	A006552
4	1, 3, 7, 33, 67, 223, 663, 912, 1383, 3777, 3972, 10669, 48375, 1740349, ...	A007646
5	1242, 18390, ...	
6	1, 2, 91, 185, 387, 488, 747, 800, 9901, 10115, 12043, 13118, 30981, 51496, 515516, ..., 4582770	A242176
7	34, 1980, 9898, 474280, ...	A242177
8	5, 17, 23, 1911, 20855, 35945, 42816, ..., 749130, ...	A242178
9	2, 12382, 27608, 31330, 117852, ...	A265013
10	1, 3, 9, 21, 363, 2161, 4839, 49521, 105994, 207777, ...	A007647
11	10, ...	
12	1, 8, 247, 3610, 4775, 19789, 187895, 345951, ...	A242196
13	...	
14	3, 5, 6, 9, 33, 45, 243, 252, 1798, 2429, 5686, 12509, 42545, 1198433, 1486287, 1909683, ...	A242197
15	8, 14, 44, 154, 274, 694, 17426, 59430, ...	A242198
16	1, 3, 55, 81, 223, 1227, 3012, 3301, ...	A242199
17	19650, 236418, ...	
18	1, 3, 21, 23, 842, 1683, 3401, 16839, 49963, 60239, 150940, 155928, 612497, ...	A007648
19	6460, ...	
20	3, 6207, 8076, 22356, 151456, 793181, 993149, ...	A338412
