= James Cullen (mathematician) =

Irish mathematician

Father James Cullen, S.J. (19 April 1867 – 7 December 1933) was an Irish mathematician.

He was born at 89 West Street, Drogheda, County Louth, to Michael Cullen, a baker, and Catherine McDonough. Initially, he was educated privately, then by the Christian Brothers. He studied pure and applied mathematics at Trinity College, Dublin, then at Mungret College, Limerick, before deciding to become a Jesuit. He studied in England in Mansera House, and St. Mary's, and was ordained as a priest on 31 July 1901.

In 1905, he taught mathematics at Mount St Mary's College, Spinkhill in Derbyshire and published his finding of what is now known as Cullen numbers in number theory.

He ended up looking after accounts for the English province of the Jesuits, while contributing to mathematics journals.

== See also ==
- Cullen number
- List of Jesuit scientists
- List of Roman Catholic scientist-clerics
