= Woodall number =

Number of the form (n * 2^n) - 1

In number theory, a Woodall number (W_{n}) is any natural number of the form

$$W_n = n \cdot 2^n - 1$$

for some natural number n. The first few Woodall numbers are:

1, 7, 23, 63, 159, 383, 895, … (sequence A003261 in the OEIS).

== History ==
Woodall numbers were first studied by Allan J. C. Cunningham and H. J. Woodall in 1917, inspired by James Cullen's earlier study of the similarly defined Cullen numbers.

== Woodall primes ==
Unsolved problem in mathematics
Are there infinitely many Woodall primes?
More unsolved problems in mathematics

Woodall numbers that are also prime numbers are called Woodall primes; the first few exponents n for which the corresponding Woodall numbers W_{n} are prime are 2, 3, 6, 30, 75, 81, 115, 123, 249, 362, 384, ... (sequence A002234 in the OEIS); the Woodall primes themselves begin with 7, 23, 383, 32212254719, ... (sequence A050918 in the OEIS).

In 1976 Christopher Hooley showed that almost all Cullen numbers are composite. In October 1995, Wilfred Keller published a paper discussing several new Cullen primes and the efforts made to factorise other Cullen and Woodall numbers. Included in that paper is a personal communication to Keller from Hiromi Suyama, asserting that Hooley's method can be reformulated to show that it works for any sequence of numbers n · 2^{n + a} + b, where a and b are integers, and in particular, that almost all Woodall numbers are composite. It is an open problem whether there are infinitely many Woodall primes. As of October 2018, thirty-four Woodall primes are known, and the largest known Woodall prime is 17016602 × 2^{17016602} − 1. It has 5,122,515 digits and was found by Diego Bertolotti in March 2018 in the distributed computing project PrimeGrid.

== Restrictions ==
Starting with W_{4} = 63 and W_{5} = 159, every sixth Woodall number is divisible by 3; thus, in order for W_{n} to be prime, the index n cannot be congruent to 4 or 5 (modulo 6). Also, for a positive integer m, the Woodall number W_{2^{m}} may be prime only if 2^{m} + m is prime. As of January 2019, the only known primes that are both Woodall primes and Mersenne primes are W_{2} = M_{3} = 7, and W_{512} = M_{521}.

== Divisibility properties ==
Like Cullen numbers, Woodall numbers have many divisibility properties. For example, if p is a prime number, then p divides

W_{(p + 1) / 2} if the Jacobi symbol $\left(\frac{2}{p}\right)$ is +1 and

W_{(3p − 1) / 2} if the Jacobi symbol $\left(\frac{2}{p}\right)$ is −1.

== Generalization ==
A generalized Woodall number base b is defined to be a number of the form n × b^{n} − 1, where n + 2 > b; if a prime can be written in this form, it is then called a generalized Woodall prime.

The smallest value of n such that n × b^{n} − 1 is prime for b = 1, 2, 3, ... are

3, 2, 1, 1, 8, 1, 2, 1, 10, 2, 2, 1, 2, 1, 2, 167, 2, 1, 12, 1, 2, 2, 29028, 1, 2, 3, 10, 2, 26850, 1, 8, 1, 42, 2, 6, 2, 24, 1, 2, 3, 2, 1, 2, 1, 2, 2, 140, 1, 2, 2, 22, 2, 8, 1, 2064, 2, 468, 6, 2, 1, 362, 1, 2, 2, 6, 3, 26, 1, 2, 3, 20, 1, 2, 1, 28, 2, 38, 5, 3024, 1, 2, 81, 858, 1, 2, 3, 2, 8, 60, 1, 2, 2, 10, 5, 2, 7, 182, 1, 17782, 3, ... (sequence A240235 in the OEIS)

As of November 2021, the largest known generalized Woodall prime with base greater than 2 is 2740879 × 32^{2740879} − 1.

== See also ==
- Mersenne prime - Prime numbers of the form 2^{n} − 1.
