= PrimeGrid =

BOINC based volunteer computing project researching prime numbers

- PrimeGrid screensaver
- Original author(s): Rytis Slatkevičius
- Initial release: June 12, 2005; 21 years ago
- Development status: Active
- Project goal(s): Finding prime numbers of various types
- Software used: PRPNet, Genefer, LLR, PFGW
- Funding: Corporate sponsorship, crowdfunding
- Platform: BOINC
- Average performance: 3,398.914 TFLOPS
- Active users: 2,330 (August 2022)
- Total users: 353,245
- Active hosts: 11,504 (August 2022)
- Total hosts: 21,985
- Website: www.primegrid.com

PrimeGrid is a volunteer computing project that searches for very large (up to world-record size) prime numbers whilst also aiming to solve long-standing mathematical conjectures. It uses the Berkeley Open Infrastructure for Network Computing (BOINC) platform. PrimeGrid offers a number of subprojects for prime-number sieving and discovery. Some of these are available through the BOINC client, others through the PRPNet client. Some of the work is manual, i.e. it requires manually starting work units and uploading results. Different subprojects may run on different operating systems, and may have executables for CPUs, GPUs, or both; while running the Lucas–Lehmer–Riesel test, CPUs with Advanced Vector Extensions and Fused Multiply-Add instruction sets will yield the fastest results for non-GPU accelerated workloads.

PrimeGrid awards badges to users in recognition of achieving certain defined levels of credit for work done. The badges have no intrinsic value but are valued by many as a sign of achievement. The issuing of badges should also benefit PrimeGrid by evening out the participation in the less popular sub projects. The easiest of the badges can often be obtained in less than a day by a single computer, whereas the most challenging badges will require far more time and computing power.

== History ==
PrimeGrid started in June 2005 under the name Message@home and tried to decipher text fragments hashed with MD5. Message@home was a test to port the BOINC scheduler to Perl to obtain greater portability. After a while the project attempted the RSA factoring challenge trying to factor RSA-640. After RSA-640 was factored by an outside team in November 2005, the project moved on to RSA-768. With the chance to succeed too small, it discarded the RSA challenges, was renamed to PrimeGrid, and started generating a list of the first prime numbers. At 210,000,000,000 the primegen subproject was stopped.

In June 2006, dialog started with Riesel Sieve to bring their project to the BOINC community. PrimeGrid provided PerlBOINC support and Riesel Sieve was successful in implementing their sieve as well as a prime finding (LLR) application. With collaboration from Riesel Sieve, PrimeGrid was able to implement the LLR application in partnership with another prime finding project, Twin Prime Search (TPS). In November 2006, the TPS LLR application was officially released at PrimeGrid. Less than two months later, January 2007, the record twin was found by the original manual project. TPS has since been completed, and the search for Sophie Germain primes was suspended in 2024.

In the summer of 2007, the Cullen and Woodall prime searches were launched. In the Fall, more prime searches were added through partnerships with the Prime Sierpinski Problem and 3*2^n-1 Search projects. Additionally, two sieves were added: the Prime Sierpinski Problem combined sieve which includes supporting the Seventeen or Bust sieve and the combined Cullen/Woodall sieve. In the fall of the same year, PrimeGrid migrated its systems from PerlBOINC to standard BOINC software.

Since September 2008, PrimeGrid is also running a Proth prime sieving subproject.

In January 2010 the subproject Seventeen or Bust (for solving the Sierpinski problem) was added. The calculations for the Riesel problem followed in March 2010.

== Projects ==
As of January 2023, PrimeGrid is working on or has worked on the following projects:

Project	Active sieve project?	Active LLR project?	Start	End	Best result
321 Prime Search (primes of the form 3 × 2^{n} ± 1)	No	Yes	30 June 2008	Ongoing	3 × 2^{18196595} − 1, largest prime found in the 321 Prime Search project
AP26 Search (Arithmetic progression of 26 primes)	—N/a	—N/a	27 December 2008	12 April 2010	43142746595714191 + 23681770 × 23# × n, n = 0, ..., 25 (AP26)
AP27 Search (Arithmetic progression of 27 primes)	—N/a	—N/a	20 September 2016	Ongoing	605185576317848261 + 155368778 × 23# × n, n = 0, ..., 26 (AP27)
Generalized Fermat Prime Search (active: n = 65536, 131072, 262144, 524288, 1048576, 2097152, 4194304 inactive: n = 8192, 16384, 32768)	Yes (manual sieving)	—N/a	January 2012	Ongoing	1963736^{1048576} + 1, largest known Generalized Fermat prime
Cullen Prime Search	No	Yes	August 2007	Ongoing	6679881 × 2^{6679881} + 1, largest known Cullen prime
Message7	No	—N/a	12 June 2005	August 2005	PerlBOINC testing successful
Prime Sierpinski Problem	No	Yes	10 July 2008	Ongoing	168451 × 2^{19375200} + 1
Extended Sierpinski Problem	No	Yes	7 June 2014	Ongoing	202705 × 2^{21320516} + 1, largest prime found in the Extended Sierpinski Problem
PrimeGen	No	—N/a	March 2006	February 2008	—N/a
Proth Prime Search	No	Yes	29 February 2008	Ongoing	7 × 2^{5775996} + 1
Riesel Problem	No	Yes	March 2010	Ongoing	9221 × 2^{11392194} − 1,
RSA-640	No	—N/a	August 2005	November 2005	—N/a
RSA-768	No	—N/a	November 2005	March 2006	—N/a
Seventeen or Bust	No	Yes	31 January 2010	Ongoing	10223 × 2^{31172165} + 1
Sierpinski/Riesel Base 5 Problem	Yes	Yes	14 June 2013	Ongoing	213988×5^{4138363} − 1, largest prime found in the Sierpinski/Riesel Base 5 Problem
Sophie Germain Prime Search	No	No	16 August 2009	February 2024	2618163402417 × 2^{1290000} − 1 (2p − 1 = 2618163402417 × 2^{1290001} − 1), the world record Sophie Germain prime; and 2996863034895 × 2^{1290000} ± 1, the world record twin primes
Twin prime Search	No	—N/a	26 November 2006	25 July 2009	65516468355 × 2^{333333} ± 1
Woodall Prime Search	No	Yes	July 2007	Ongoing	17016602 × 2^{17016602} − 1, largest known Woodall prime
Generalized Cullen/Woodall Prime Search	No	Yes	22 October 2016	Ongoing	2525532 × 73^{2525532} + 1, largest known generalized Cullen prime
Wieferich Prime Search	—N/a	—N/a	2020	2022	—N/a
Wall-Sun-Sun Prime Search	—N/a	—N/a	2020	2022	—N/a

=== 321 Prime Search ===
321 Prime Search is a continuation of Paul Underwood's 321 Search which looked for primes of the form 3 · 2^{n} − 1. PrimeGrid added the +1 form and continues the search up to n = 25M.

Primes known for 3 · 2^{n} + 1 occur at the following n:

1, 2, 5, 6, 8, 12, 18, 30, 36, 41, 66, 189, 201, 209, 276, 353, 408, 438, 534, 2208, 2816, 3168, 3189, 3912, 20909, 34350, 42294, 42665, 44685, 48150, 54792, 55182, 59973, 80190, 157169, 213321, 303093, 362765, 382449, 709968, 801978, 916773, 1832496, 2145353, 2291610, 2478785, 5082306, 7033641, 10829346, 16408818 (sequence A002253 in the OEIS)

Primes known for 3 · 2^{n} − 1 occur at the following n:

0, 1, 2, 3, 4, 6, 7, 11, 18, 34, 38, 43, 55, 64, 76, 94, 103, 143, 206, 216, 306, 324, 391, 458, 470, 827, 1274, 3276, 4204, 5134, 7559, 12676, 14898, 18123, 18819, 25690, 26459, 41628, 51387, 71783, 80330, 85687, 88171, 97063, 123630, 155930, 164987, 234760, 414840, 584995, 702038, 727699, 992700, 1201046, 1232255, 2312734, 3136255, 4235414, 6090515, 11484018, 11731850, 11895718, 16819291, 17748034, 18196595 (sequence A002235 in the OEIS)

=== PRPNet projects ===
Project	Active?	Start	End	Best result
27 Prime Search	No	—N/a	March 2022	27 × 2^{7046834} + 1, largest known Sierpinski prime for b = 2 and k = 27; 27×2^{8342438} − 1, largest known Riesel prime for b = 2 and k = 27
121 Prime Search	No	—N/a	April 2021	121 × 2^{9584444} − 1, largest known Sierpinski prime for b = 2 and k = 121; 121 × 2^{4553899} − 1, largest known Riesel prime for b = 2 and k = 121
Extended Sierpinski problem	No	—N/a	2014	90527 × 2^{9162167} + 1
Factorial Prime Search	Yes	—N/a	Ongoing	147855! − 1, 5th largest known factorial prime
Dual Sierpinski problem (Five or Bust)	No	—N/a	All were done (all PRPs were found)	2^{9092392} + 40291
Generalized Cullen/Woodall Prime Search	No	—N/a	2017	427194 × 113^{427194} + 1, then largest known GCW prime
Mega Prime Search	No	—N/a	2014	87 × 2^{3496188} + 1, largest known prime for k = 87
Primorial Prime Search	Yes	2008	Ongoing	9562633# + 1 (4151498 digits), largest known primorial prime
Proth Prime Search	No	2008	2012	10223 × 2^{31172165} + 1, largest known Proth prime
Sierpinski Riesel Base 5	No	2009	2013	180062 × 5^{2249192} − 1
Wieferich Prime Search	No	2012	2017	82687771042557349, closest near-miss above 3 × 10^{15}
Wall-Sun-Sun Prime Search	No	2012	2017	6336823451747417, closest near-miss above 9.7 × 10^{14}

== Accomplishments ==
=== AP26 ===
One of PrimeGrid projects was AP26 Search which searched for a record 26 primes in arithmetic progression. The search was successful in April 2010 with the finding of the first known AP26:

43142746595714191 + 23681770 · 23# · n is prime for n = 0, ..., 25.
23# = 2·3·5·7·11·13·17·19·23 = 223092870, or 23 primorial, is the product of all primes up to 23.

=== AP27 ===
Next target of the project was AP27 Search which searched for a record 27 primes in arithmetic progression. The search was successful in September 2019 with the finding of the first known AP27:

224584605939537911 + 81292139 · 23# · n is prime for n = 0, ..., 26.
23# = 2·3·5·7·11·13·17·19·23 = 223092870, or 23 primorial, is the product of all primes up to 23.

=== Cullen prime search ===
PrimeGrid is also running a search for Cullen prime numbers, yielding the two largest known Cullen primes. The first one being the 14th largest known prime at the time of discovery, and the second one was PrimeGrid's largest prime found 6679881 · 2^{6679881} + 1 at over 2 million digits.

=== Generalized Fermat prime search ===
On 24 September 2022, PrimeGrid discovered the largest known Generalized Fermat prime to date, 1963736^{1048576} + 1. This prime is 6,598,776 digits long and is only the second Generalized Fermat prime found for n = 20. It ranks as the 13th largest known prime overall.

=== Riesel Problem ===
As of 13 December 2022, PrimeGrid has eliminated 18 values of k from the Riesel problem and is continuing the search to eliminate the 43 remaining numbers. 3 values of k are found by independent searchers.

=== Twin prime search ===
Primegrid worked with the Twin Prime Search to search for a record-sized twin prime at approximately 58,700 digits. The new world's largest known twin prime 2003663613 × 2^{195000} ± 1 was eventually discovered on January 15, 2007 (sieved by Twin Prime Search and tested by PrimeGrid). The search continued for another record twin prime at just above 100,000 digits. It was completed in August 2009 when PrimeGrid found 65516468355 × 2^{333333} ± 1. Continued testing for twin primes in conjunction with the search for a Sophie Germain prime yielded a new record twin prime in September 2016 upon finding the number 2996863034895 × 2^{1290000} ± 1 composed of 388,342 digits.

=== Woodall prime search ===
As of 22 April 2018, the project has discovered the four largest Woodall primes known to date. The largest of these is 17016602 × 2^{17016602} − 1 and was found on 21 March 2018. The search continues for an even bigger Woodall prime. PrimeGrid also found the largest known generalized Woodall prime, 563528 × 13^{563528} − 1.

== Media coverage ==
PrimeGrid's author Rytis Slatkevičius has been featured as a young entrepreneur in The Economist.

PrimeGrid has also been featured in an article by Francois Grey in the CERN Courier and a talk about citizen cyberscience in TEDx Warwick conference.

In the first Citizen Cyberscience Summit, Rytis Slatkevičius gave a talk as a founder of PrimeGrid, named Finding primes: from digits to digital technology, relating mathematics and volunteering and featuring the history of the project.
