= SIMAP =

SIMAP or simap may refer to:

- Similarity Matrix of Proteins, a database of protein similarities
- simap.ch, the official gazette for Swiss government procurement
