= Sequence database =

In the field of bioinformatics, a sequence database is a type of biological database that is composed of a large collection of computerized ("digital") nucleic acid sequences, protein sequences, or other polymer sequences stored on a computer. The UniProt database is an example of a protein sequence database. As of 2013 it contained over 40 million sequences and is growing at an exponential rate. Historically, sequences were published in paper form, but as the number of sequences grew, this storage method became unsustainable.

== Search ==
Searching in a sequence database involves looking for similarities between a genomic/protein sequence and a query string and, finding the sequence in the database that "best" matches the target sequence (based on criteria which vary depending on the search method). The number of matches/hits is used to formulate a score that determines the similarity between the sequence query and the sequences in the sequence database. The main goal is to have a good balance between the two criteria.

== History ==
=== 1950 ===
The need for sequence databases originated in 1950 when Frederick Sanger reported the primary structure of insulin. He won his second Nobel Prize for creating methods for sequencing nucleic acids, and his comparative approach is what sparked other protein biochemists to begin collecting amino acid sequences. Thus marking the beginning of molecular databases.

=== 1960 ===
In 1965 Margaret Dayhoff and her team at the National Biomedical Research Foundation (NBRF) published "The Atlas of Protein Sequence and Structure". They put all know protein sequences in the Atlas, even unpublished material. This can be seen as the first attempt to create a molecular database. They made use of the newly computerized (1964) Medical Literature Analysis and Retrieval System (MEDLARS) at the National Institutes of Health (NIH). The team used computers to store the data but had to manually type and proofread each sequence, which had a high cost in time and money.

In 1966 the team released the second edition of the Atlas, double the size of the first. It contained about 1000 sequences, and this time was coined as an information explosion. The NBRF was on the cutting edge of utilizing computers for medicine and biology at this time. Dayhoff and her team made use of their facilities for determining amino acid sequences of protein molecules in mainframe computers. The number of discovered sequences continued to grow allowing for a deeper comparative analysis of proteins than ever before. This led to many developments such as, probabilistic models of amino acid substitutions, sequence aligning and phylogenetic trees of evolutionary relationships of proteins.

=== 1970s ===
The entire sequencing process became fully automated.

=== 1980 ===
The first nucleotide sequence database was created. Previously known as the European Molecular Biology Laboratory (EMBL) Nucleotide Sequence Data Library (now known as European Nucleotide archive). Human Genome Project began in 1988. The project's goal was sequence and map all the genes in a human which required the capability to create and utilize a large sequence database.

=== Present day ===
We now have many sequence databases, tools for using them and easy access to them. One of the largest being GenBank which contains over 2 billion sequences.

=== Timeline ===
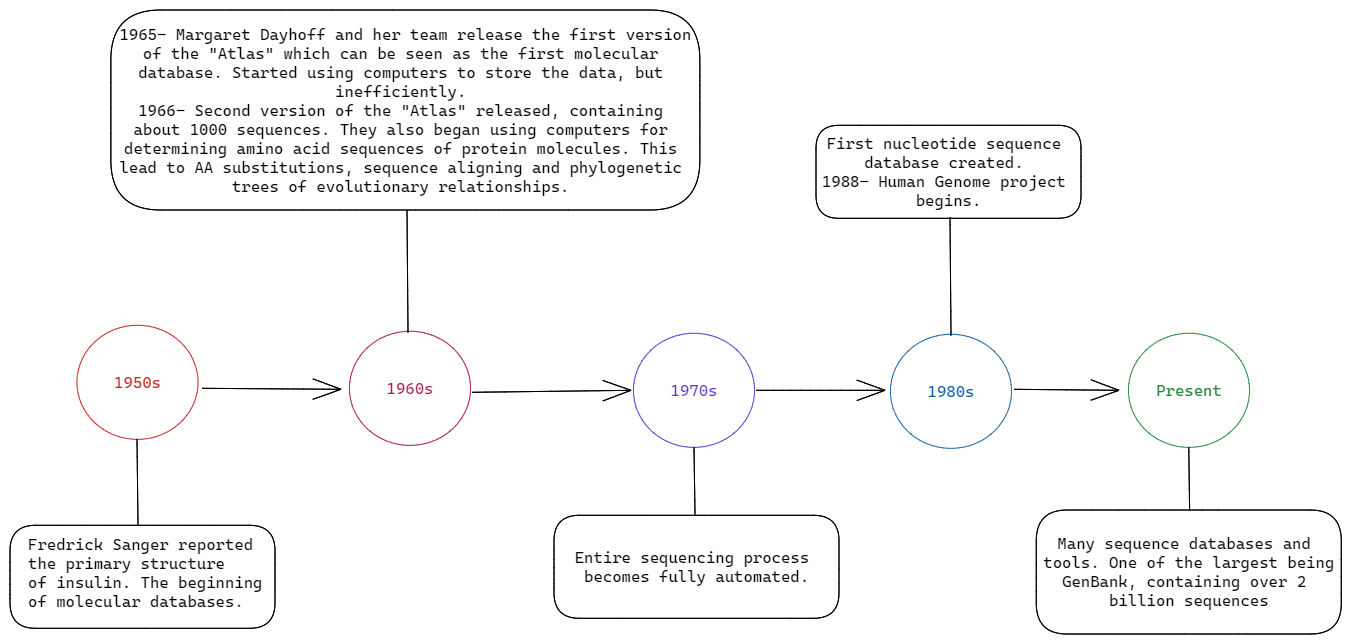
Timeline for the creation of sequence databases.

== Current issues ==
=== Storage & redundancy ===
Records in sequence databases are deposited from a wide range of sources, from individual researchers to large genome sequencing centers. As a result, the sequences themselves, and especially the biological annotations attached to these sequences, may vary in quality. There is much redundancy, as multiple labs may submit numerous sequences that are identical, or nearly identical, to others in the databases.

Many sequence annotations are based not on laboratory experiments, but on the results of sequence similarity searches for previously annotated sequences. Once a sequence has been annotated based on similarity to others, and itself deposited in the database, it can also become the basis for future annotations. This can lead to a transitive annotation problem because there may be several such annotation transfers by sequence similarity between a particular database record and actual wet lab experimental information. Therefore, care must be taken when interpreting the annotation data from sequence databases.

=== Scoring methods ===
Most of the current database search algorithms rank alignment by a score, which is usually a particular scoring system. The solution towards solving this issue is found by making a variety of scoring systems available to suit to the specific problem.

=== Alignment statistics ===
Searching algorithm often produce an ordered list lacking biological significance.

== See also ==
- FASTA format – File format for DNA or protein sequences
- SIMAP – BOINC based volunteer computing project
- List of biological databases
- Bioinformatics – Computational analysis of large, complex sets of biological data
