= SETI@home beta =

BOINC based volunteer computing project supporting SETI@home development

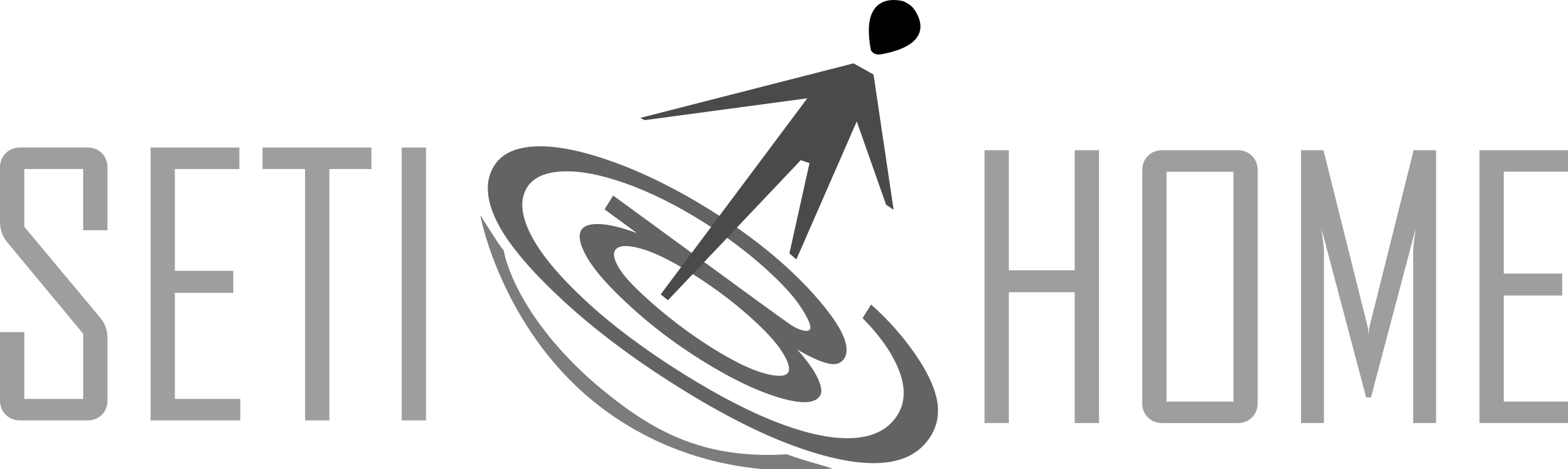

- Developer(s): University of California, Berkeley
- Development status: In hibernation
- Platform: BOINC
- Website: setiweb.ssl.berkeley.edu/beta/

SETI@home beta, is a hibernating volunteer computing project using the Berkeley Open Infrastructure for Network Computing (BOINC) platform, as a test environment for future SETI@home projects:

- AstroPulse is a volunteer computing project searching for primordial black holes, pulsars, and ETI. AstroPulse clients have been tested by this project for nearly 6 years. It is already running on SETI@home, testing new GPU/CPU optimized apps and performing other tasks.
- SETI Southern Hemisphere Search, which is another SETI@home project that was due to join BOINC. It was expected that this project would use a slightly modified version of the SETI enhanced client, as the Parkes Observatory has a feedhorn with more beams than the Arecibo Observatory.

== Applications Testing ==
- 11 Dec 2008, CUDA applications test
- 3 Jun 2013, SETI@home v7 test
- 01 Dec 2015 SETI@home v8 test
