= ABC@Home =

Non-profit BOINC based volunteer computing project

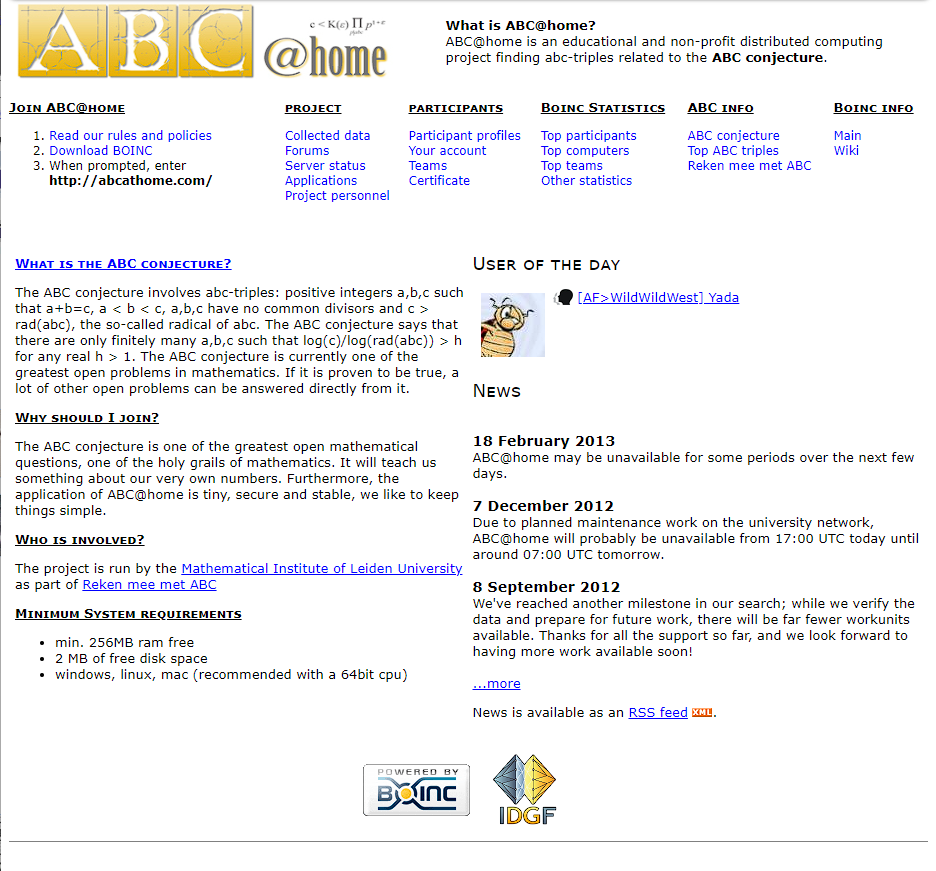
- Developer: University of Leiden
- Stable release: 2.10 / August 22, 2010; 15 years ago
- Operating system: Cross-platform
- Platform: BOINC
- Available in: English
- Type: Volunteer computing
- License: Proprietary
- Website: ABC@Home

ABC@Home was an educational and non-profit network computing project finding abc-triples related to the abc conjecture in number theory using the Berkeley Open Infrastructure for Network Computing (BOINC) volunteer computing platform.

In March 2011, there were more than 7,300 active participants from 114 countries with a total BOINC credit of more than 2.9 billion, reporting about 10 teraflops (10 trillion operations per second) of processing power.

In 2011, the project met its goal of finding all abc-triples of at most 18 digits. By 2015, the project had found 23.8 million triples in total, and ceased operations soon after.

== See also ==
- List of volunteer computing projects
