= MilkyWay@home =

BOINC based volunteer computing project researching astronomy

- Simulation of two galaxies interacting with each other at MilkyWay@home
- Developer(s): Rensselaer Polytechnic Institute
- Development status: Active
- Operating system: Cross-platform
- Platform: BOINC
- Type: astroinformatics
- License: GNU GPL v3
- Average performance: 1,683,957 GFLOPS (June 2023)
- Active users: 11,686
- Total users: 255,522
- Active hosts: 30,519
- Total hosts: 674,908
- Website: milkyway.cs.rpi.edu/milkyway/

MilkyWay@home is a volunteer computing project in the astrophysics category, running on the Berkeley Open Infrastructure for Network Computing (BOINC) platform. Using spare computing power from over 38,000 computers run by over 27,000 active volunteers as of November 2011, the MilkyWay@home project aims to generate accurate three-dimensional dynamic models of stellar streams in the immediate vicinity of the Milky Way. With SETI@home and Einstein@home, it is the third computing project of this type that has the investigation of phenomena in interstellar space as its primary purpose. Its secondary objective is to develop and optimize algorithms for volunteer computing.

== Purpose and design ==
MilkyWay@home is a collaboration between the Rensselaer Polytechnic Institute's departments of Computer Science and Physics, Applied Physics and Astronomy and is supported by the U.S. National Science Foundation. It is operated by a team that includes astrophysicist Heidi Jo Newberg and computer scientists Malik Magdon-Ismail, Bolesław Szymański and Carlos A. Varela.

By mid-2009 the project's main astrophysical interest is in the Sagittarius Stream, an immense stellar stream emanating from the Sagittarius Dwarf Spheroidal Galaxy that wraps around the Milky Way. Mapping such interstellar streams and their dynamics with high accuracy may provide crucial clues for understanding the structure, formation, evolution, and gravitational potential distribution of the Milky Way and similar galaxies. It could also provide insight on the dark matter issue. As the project evolves, it might turn its attention to other star streams.

Using data from the Sloan Digital Sky Survey, MilkyWay@home divides starfields into wedges of about 2.5 deg. width and applies self-optimizing probabilistic separation techniques (i.e., evolutionary algorithms) to extract the optimized tidal streams. The program then attempts to create a new, uniformly dense wedge of stars from the input wedge by removing streams of data. Each stream removed is characterized by six parameters: percent of stars in the stream; the angular position in the stripe; the three spatial components (two angles, plus the radial distance from Earth) defining the removed cylinder; and a measure of width. For each search, the server application keeps track of a population of individual stars, each of which is attached to a possible model of the Milky Way.

== Project details and statistics ==
MilkyWay@home has been active since 2007, and optimized client applications for 32-bit and 64-bit operating systems became available in 2008. Its screensaver capability is limited to a revolving display of users' BOINC statistics, with no graphical component. Instead, animations of the best computer simulations are shared through YouTube.

The work units that are sent out to clients used to require only 2–4 hours of computation on modern CPUs, however, they were scheduled for completion with a short deadline (typically, three days). By early 2010, the project routinely sent much larger units that take 15–20 hours of computation time on the average processor core, and are valid for about a week from a download. This made the project less suitable for computers that are not in operation for periods of several days, or for user accounts that do not allow BOINC to compute in the background. As of 2018, many GPU-based tasks only require less than a minute to complete on a high-end graphics card.

The project's data throughput progress has been very dynamic recently. In mid-June 2009, the project had about 24,000 registered users and about 1,100 participating teams in 149 countries and was operating at 31.7 TeraFLOPS. As of 12 January 2010, these figures were at 44,900 users and 1,590 teams in 170 countries, but average computing power had jumped to 1,382 TFlops, which would rank MilkyWay@home second among the TOP500 list of supercomputers. MilkyWay@home is currently the 2nd largest volunteer computing project behind Folding@Home which crossed 5,000 TFlops in 2009.

That data throughput massively outpaced new user acquisition is mostly due to the deployment of client software that uses commonly available medium and high performance graphics processing units (GPUs) for numerical operations in Windows and Linux environments. MilkyWay@home CUDA code for a broad range of Nvidia GPUs was first released on the project's code release directory on June 11, 2009, following experimental releases in the MilkyWay@home (GPU) fork of the project. An OpenCL application for AMD Radeon GPUs is also available.

MilkyWay@home is a whitelisted gridcoin project. It is the second-largest manufacturer of gridcoins.

== Scientific results ==
Large parts of the MilkyWay@home project are created for Nathan Cole's thesis and there are also several other theses and scientific publications inspired by the resulting calculations of this projects applications.

1. Mendelsohn, Eric J.; Newberg, Heidi Jo; Shelton, Siddhartha; Widrow, Lawrence M.; Thompson, Jeffery M.; Grillmair, Carl J. (1 February 2022). "Estimate of the Mass and Radial Profile of the Orphan–Chenab Stream's Dwarf-galaxy Progenitor Using MilkyWay@home". The Astrophysical Journal. 926 (2): 106. arXiv:2201.03637. Bibcode:2022ApJ...926..106M. doi:10.3847/1538-4357/ac498a. S2CID 245853837.
2. Donlon, T.; Newberg, H.; Weiss, J.; Guffey, A.; Thompson, J. (2021-06-01). "A Trifurcated Sagittarius Stream in the South". AAS/Division of Dynamical Astronomy Meeting. 53 (5): 403.03. Bibcode:2021DDA....5240303D.
3. Mendelsohn, E. J.; Newberg, H. J.; Shelton, S.; Widrow, L.; Thompson, J.; Grillmair, C. (2021-06-01). "Estimate of the Mass and Radial Profile of the Orphan Stream's Dwarf Galaxy Progenitor Using MilkyWay@home". AAS/Division of Dynamical Astronomy Meeting. 53 (5): 403.01. Bibcode:2021DDA....5240301M.
4. Mendelsohn, E. J.; Newberg, H. J.; Donlon, T.; Thompson, J. M. (2020-08-01). "N-Body Simulations with MilkyWay@home". AAS/Division of Dynamical Astronomy Meeting. 52 (4): 200.01. Bibcode:2020DDA....5120001M.
5. Donlon, Thomas; Newberg, Heidi Jo; Sanderson, Robyn; Widrow, Lawrence M. (2020-10-01). "The Milky Way's Shell Structure Reveals the Time of a Radial Collision". The Astrophysical Journal. 902 (2): 119. arXiv:2006.08764. Bibcode:2020ApJ...902..119D. doi:10.3847/1538-4357/abb5f6. S2CID 219708644.
6. Shelton, Siddhartha; Newberg, Heidi Jo; Weiss, Jake; Bauer, Jacob S.; Arsenault, Matthew; Widrow, Larry; Rayment, Clayton; Desell, Travis; Judd, Roland; Magdon-Ismail, Malik; Mendelsohn, Eric; Newby, Matthew; Rice, Colin; Szymanski, Boleslaw K.; Thompson, Jeffery M.; Varela, Carlos; Willett, Benjamin; Ulin, Steve; Newberg, Lee (14 February 2021). "An Algorithm for Reconstructing the Orphan Stream Progenitor with MilkyWay@home Volunteer Computing". arXiv:2102.07257.
7. Newberg, Heidi Jo; Shelton, Siddhartha; Mendelsohn, Eric; Weiss, Jake; Arsenault, Matthew; Bauer, Jacob S.; Desell, Travis; Judd, Roland; Magdon-Ismail, Malik; Newberg, Lee A.; Newby, Matthew; Rayment, Clayton; Rice, Colin; Szymanski, Boleslaw K.; Thompson, Jeffery M. (June 2019). "Streams and the Milky Way dark matter halo". Proceedings of the International Astronomical Union. 14 (S353): 75–82. doi:10.1017/S174392131900855X. S2CID 208163330.
8. Shelton, Siddhartha; Newberg, Heidi Jo; Weiss, Jake; Bauer, Jacob S.; Arsenault, Matthew; Widrow, Larry; Rayment, Clayton; Desell, Travis; Judd, Roland; Magdon-Ismail, Malik; Mendelsohn, Eric; Newby, Matthew; Rice, Colin; Szymanski, Boleslaw K.; Thompson, Jeffery M. (2021-02-14). "An Algorithm for Reconstructing the Orphan Stream Progenitor with MilkyWay@home Volunteer Computing". arXiv:2102.07257.
9. Weiss, Jake; Newberg, Heidi Jo; Desell, Travis (22 October 2018). "A Tangle of Stellar Streams in the North Galactic Cap". The Astrophysical Journal. 867 (1): L1. arXiv:1807.03754. Bibcode:2018ApJ...867L...1W. doi:10.3847/2041-8213/aae5fc. S2CID 55047680.
10. Shelton, Siddhartha (December 2018). Constraining dwarf galaxy properties using tidal streams (Thesis). Bibcode:2018PhDT.......235S. hdl:20.500.13015/2346.
11. Weiss, Jake (2018). The Stellar Density of the Major Substructure in the Milky Way Halo (Thesis). ProQuest 2125438843.
12. Weiss, Jake; Newberg, Heidi Jo; Newby, Matthew; Desell, Travis (27 September 2018). "Fitting the Density Substructure of the Stellar Halo with MilkyWay@home". The Astrophysical Journal Supplement Series. 238 (2): 17. arXiv:1808.06659. Bibcode:2018ApJS..238...17W. doi:10.3847/1538-4365/aadb92. S2CID 119327847.
13. Newberg, Heidi Jo; Shelton, Siddhartha; Weiss, Jake (2018-01-01). "Characterizing Milky Way Tidal Streams and Dark Matter with MilkyWay@home". American Astronomical Society Meeting Abstracts #231. 231: 212.07. Bibcode:2018AAS...23121207N.
14. Newberg, Heidi; Shelton, Siddhartha (2018-04-01). "Reconstructing the Dwarf Galaxy Progenitor from Tidal Streams Using MilkyWay@home". AAS/Division of Dynamical Astronomy Meeting. 49: 303.02. Bibcode:2018DDA....4930302N.
15. Dumas, Julie; Newberg, Heidi J.; Niedzielski, Bethany; Susser, Adam; Thompson, Jeffery M.; Weiss, Jake; Lewis, Kim M. (16 September 2015). "Testing the Dark Matter Caustic Theory Against Observations in the Milky Way". The Astrophysical Journal. 811 (1): 36. arXiv:1508.04494. Bibcode:2015ApJ...811...36D. doi:10.1088/0004-637x/811/1/36. S2CID 62792604.
16. Weiss, Jake; Newberg, Heidi Jo; Arsenault, Matthew; Bechtel, Torrin; Desell, Travis; Newby, Matthew; Thompson, Jeffery M. (2016-01-01). "Using A New Model for Main Sequence Turnoff Absolute Magnitudes to Measure Stellar Streams in the Milky Way Halo". American Astronomical Society Meeting Abstracts #227. 227: 341.19. Bibcode:2016AAS...22734119W.
17. Shelton, Siddhartha; Newberg, Heidi Jo; Arsenault, Matthew; Bauer, Jacob; Desell, Travis; Judd, Roland; Magdon-Ismail, Malik; Newby, Matthew; Rice, Colin; Thompson, Jeffrey; Ulin, Steve; Weiss, Jake; Widrow, Larry (2016-01-01). "Measuring Dark Matter With MilkyWay@home". American Astronomical Society Meeting Abstracts #227. 227: 139.11. Bibcode:2016AAS...22713911S.
18. Xu, Yan; Newberg, Heidi Jo; Carlin, Jeffrey L.; Liu, Chao; Deng, Licai; Li, Jing; Schönrich, Ralph; Yanny, Brian (11 March 2015). "Rings and Radial Waves in the Disk of the Milky Way". The Astrophysical Journal. 801 (2): 105. arXiv:1503.00257. Bibcode:2015ApJ...801..105X. doi:10.1088/0004-637x/801/2/105. S2CID 119124338.
19. Scibelli, Samantha; Newberg, Heidi Jo; Carlin, Jeffrey L.; Yanny, Brian (2 December 2014). "Census of blue stars in SDSS DR8". The Astrophysical Journal Supplement Series. 215 (2): 24. arXiv:1411.5744. Bibcode:2014ApJS..215...24S. doi:10.1088/0067-0049/215/2/24. S2CID 8621834.
20. Newberg, Heidi Jo (August 2012). "Determining distances to stars statistically from photometry". Proceedings of the International Astronomical Union. 8 (S289): 74–81. arXiv:1411.5999. doi:10.1017/S174392131202114X. S2CID 119071864.
21. Xu, Yan; Newberg, Heidi (May 2013). "Exploration of Galactic Structures beyond the Sun toward the anti-center of the Milky Way". Proceedings of the International Astronomical Union. 9 (S298): 450. doi:10.1017/S1743921313007151. S2CID 123228241.
22. Newberg, Heidi Jo; Newby, Matthew; Desell, Travis; Magdon-Ismail, Malik; Szymanski, Boleslaw; Varela, Carlos (May 2013). "MilkyWay@home: Harnessing volunteer computers to constrain dark matter in the Milky Way". Proceedings of the International Astronomical Union. 9 (S298): 98–104. arXiv:1411.6003. doi:10.1017/S1743921313006273. S2CID 8058974.
23. Newby, Matthew (August 2013). The Sagittarius tidal stream and the shape of the galactic stellar halo (Thesis). Bibcode:2013PhDT........69N. hdl:20.500.13015/971. ProQuest 1466022697.
24. Newby, Matthew; Cole, Nathan; Newberg, Heidi Jo; Desell, Travis; Magdon-Ismail, Malik; Szymanski, Boleslaw; Varela, Carlos; Willett, Benjamin; Yanny, Brian (13 May 2013). "A Spatial Characterization of the Sagittarius Dwarf Galaxy Tidal Tails". The Astronomical Journal. 145 (6): 163. arXiv:1304.1476. Bibcode:2013AJ....145..163N. doi:10.1088/0004-6256/145/6/163.
25. Guevara, Gustavo; Desell, Travis; LaPorte, Jason; Varela, Carlos A. (1 April 2011). "Modular Visualization of Distributed Systems". CLEI Electronic Journal. 14 (1). doi:10.19153/cleiej.14.1.7. S2CID 4876137.
26. Desell, Travis; Magdon-Ismail, Malik; Newberg, Heidi; Newberg, Lee A.; Szymanski, Boleslaw K.; Varela, Carlos A. (2016-12-30). "A Robust Asynchronous Newton Method for Massive Scale Computing Systems". arXiv:1702.02204.
27. Desell, Travis; Magdon-Ismail, Malik; Szymanski, Boleslaw; Varela, Carlos A.; Willett, Benjamin A.; Arsenault, Matthew; Newberg, Heidi (2011). "Evolving N-Body Simulations to Determine the Origin and Structure of the Milky Way Galaxy's Halo Using Volunteer Computing". 2011 IEEE International Symposium on Parallel and Distributed Processing Workshops and PhD Forum. pp. 1888–1895. CiteSeerX 10.1.1.731.7231. doi:10.1109/IPDPS.2011.346. ISBN 978-1-61284-425-1. S2CID 10643895.
28. Desell, Travis; Anderson, David P.; Magdon-Ismail, Malik; New, Heidi; Szymanski, Boleslaw K.; Varela, Carlos A. (2010). "An analysis of massively distributed evolutionary algorithms". IEEE Congress on Evolutionary Computation. pp. 1–8. doi:10.1109/CEC.2010.5586073. ISBN 978-1-4244-6909-3. S2CID 581517.
29. Desell, Travis; Magdon-Ismail, Malik; Szymanski, Boleslaw; Varela, Carlos A.; Newberg, Heidi; Anderson, David P. (2010). "Validating Evolutionary Algorithms on Volunteer Computing Grids". Distributed Applications and Interoperable Systems. Lecture Notes in Computer Science. Vol. 6115. pp. 29–41. doi:10.1007/978-3-642-13645-0_3. ISBN 978-3-642-13644-3.
30. Cole, Nate; Desell, Travis; Lombraña González, Daniel; Fernández De Vega, Francisco; Magdon-Ismail, Malik; Newberg, Heidi; Szymanski, Boleslaw; Varela, Carlos (2010). "Evolutionary Algorithms on Volunteer Computing Platforms: The Milky Way@Home Project". Parallel and Distributed Computational Intelligence. Studies in Computational Intelligence. Vol. 269. pp. 63–90. doi:10.1007/978-3-642-10675-0_4. ISBN 978-3-642-10674-3.
31. Desell, Travis (December 2009). Asynchronous global optimization for massive-scale computing (Thesis). hdl:20.500.13015/2902. OCLC 1150135368.
32. Desell, Travis; Magdon-Ismail, Malik; Szymanski, Boleslaw; Varela, Carlos; Newberg, Heidi; Cole, Nathan (2009). "Robust Asynchronous Optimization for Volunteer Computing Grids". 2009 Fifth IEEE International Conference on e-Science. pp. 263–270. CiteSeerX 10.1.1.158.8407. doi:10.1109/e-Science.2009.44. ISBN 978-1-4244-5340-5. S2CID 5214001.
33. Desell, Travis; Waters, Anthony; Magdon-Ismail, Malik; Szymanski, Boleslaw K.; Varela, Carlos A.; Newby, Matthew; Newberg, Heidi; Przystawik, Andreas; Anderson, David (2010). "Accelerating the Milky Way@Home Volunteer Computing Project with GPUs". Parallel Processing and Applied Mathematics. Lecture Notes in Computer Science. Vol. 6067. pp. 276–288. doi:10.1007/978-3-642-14390-8_29. ISBN 978-3-642-14389-2.
34. Desell, Travis; Szymanski, Boleslaw; Varela, Carlos (2008). "An asynchronous hybrid genetic-simplex search for modeling the Milky Way galaxy using volunteer computing". Proceedings of the 10th annual conference on Genetic and evolutionary computation. pp. 921–928. doi:10.1145/1389095.1389273. ISBN 9781605581309. S2CID 10952453.
35. Cole, Nathan; Newberg, Heidi Jo; Magdon-Ismail, Malik; Desell, Travis; Dawsey, Kristopher; Hayashi, Warren; Liu, Xinyang Fred; Purnell, Jonathan; Szymanski, Boleslaw; Varela, Carlos; Willett, Benjamin; Wisniewski, James (20 August 2008). "Maximum Likelihood Fitting of Tidal Streams with Application to the Sagittarius Dwarf Tidal Tails". The Astrophysical Journal. 683 (2): 750–766. arXiv:0805.2121. Bibcode:2008ApJ...683..750C. doi:10.1086/589681. S2CID 1660060.
36. Desell, Travis; Szymanski, Boleslaw; Varela, Carlos (2008). "Asynchronous genetic search for scientific modeling on large-scale heterogeneous environments". 2008 IEEE International Symposium on Parallel and Distributed Processing. pp. 1–12. doi:10.1109/IPDPS.2008.4536169. ISBN 978-1-4244-1693-6. S2CID 1107218.
37. Szymanski, Boleslaw K.; Desell, Travis; Varela, Carlos (2008). "The Effects of Heterogeneity on Asynchronous Panmictic Genetic Search". Parallel Processing and Applied Mathematics. Lecture Notes in Computer Science. Vol. 4967. pp. 457–468. CiteSeerX 10.1.1.78.2043. doi:10.1007/978-3-540-68111-3_48. ISBN 978-3-540-68105-2.
38. Desell, Travis; Cole, Nathan; Magdon-Ismail, Malik; Newberg, Heidi; Szymanski, Boleslaw; Varela, Carlos (2007). "Distributed and Generic Maximum Likelihood Evaluation". Third IEEE International Conference on e-Science and Grid Computing (E-Science 2007). pp. 337–344. CiteSeerX 10.1.1.65.4065. doi:10.1109/E-SCIENCE.2007.30. ISBN 978-0-7695-3064-2. S2CID 1043475.

== See also ==
- List of volunteer computing projects
