= Berkeley Open Infrastructure for Network Computing =

Open source middleware system for volunteer and grid computing

BOINC

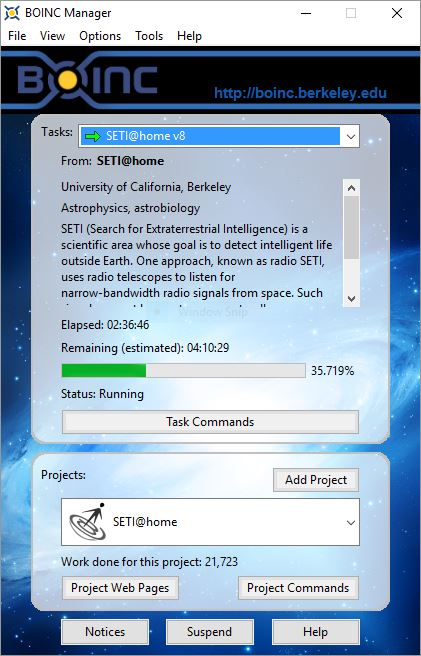
- BOINC Manager Simple View
- Developer: University of California, Berkeley
- Release: 10 April 2002; 24 years ago
- Stable release: 8.2.11 Windows; 20 April 2026; 6 months ago 8.2.11 macOS; 20 April 2026; 6 months ago 8.2.13 Linux; 4 May 2026; 6 months ago 8.2.11 Android; 4 May 2026; 6 months ago
- Preview release: 8.2.15 / 15 June 2026; 5 months ago
- Written in: C++ (client/server); PHP (project CMS); Java/Kotlin (Android client)
- Operating system: Windows macOS; Linux; Android; FreeBSD; Raspberry Pi OS
- Type: Grid computing and volunteer computing
- License: LGPL-3.0-or-later; Project licensing varies
- Website: boinc.berkeley.edu
- Repository: github.com/BOINC/boinc

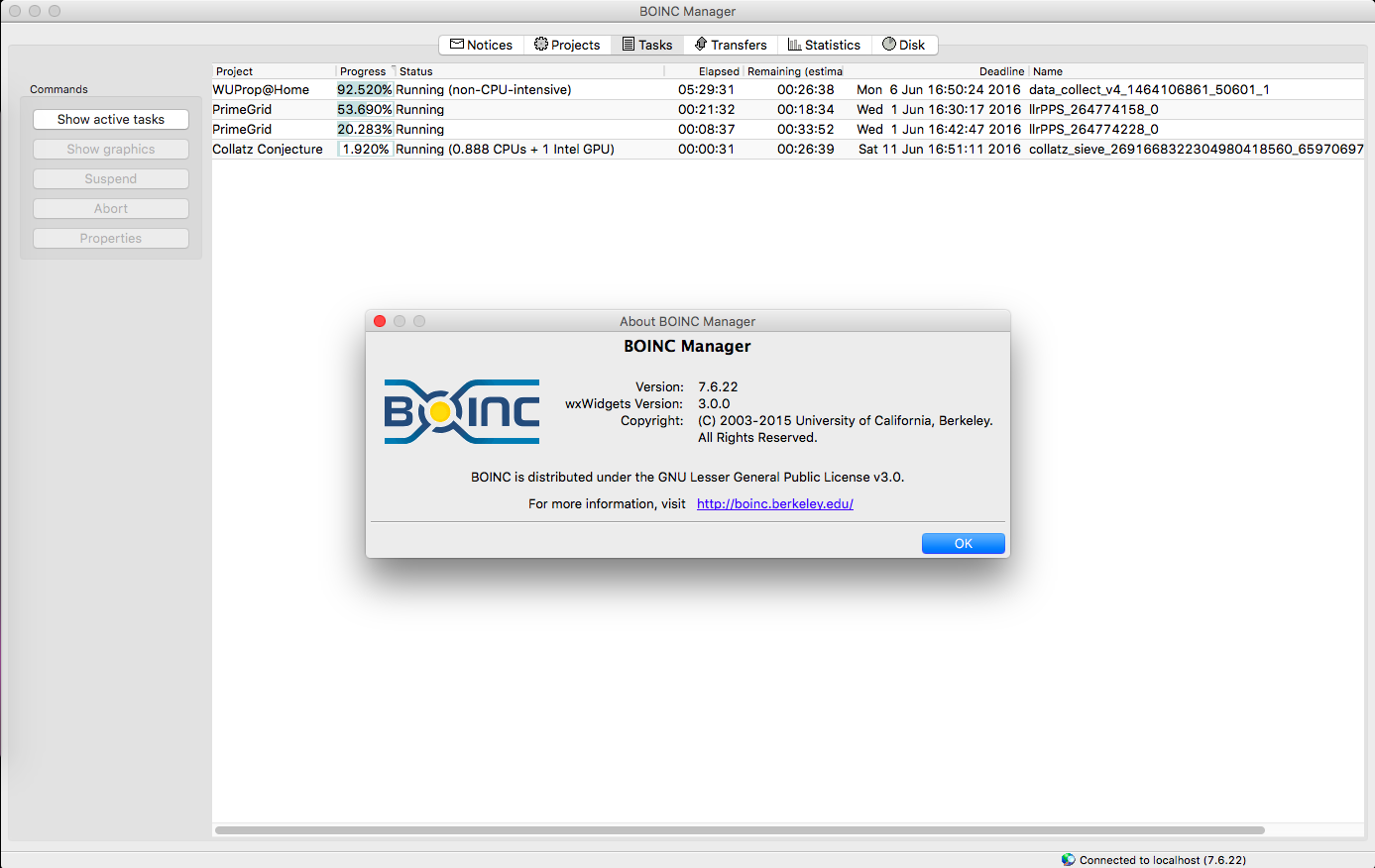
BOINC Manager Advanced View

The Berkeley Open Infrastructure for Network Computing (BOINC, pronounced /bɔɪŋk/ –rhymes with "oink") is an open-source middleware system for volunteer computing (a type of distributed computing). Developed originally to support SETI@home, it became the platform for many other applications in areas as diverse as medicine, molecular biology, mathematics, linguistics, climatology, environmental science, and astrophysics, among others. The purpose of BOINC is to enable researchers to utilize processing resources of personal computers and other devices around the world.

BOINC development began with a group based at the Space Sciences Laboratory (SSL) at the University of California, Berkeley, and led by David P. Anderson, who also led SETI@home. As a high-performance volunteer computing platform, BOINC brings together 25,314 active participants employing 130,853 active computers (hosts) worldwide, processing daily on average 15.220 PetaFLOPS as of 13 August 2026 (it would be the 139th largest processing capability in the world compared with an individual supercomputer). The National Science Foundation (NSF) funds BOINC through awards SCI/0221529, SCI/0438443 and SCI/0721124. Guinness World Records ranks BOINC as the largest computing grid in the world.

BOINC code runs on various operating systems, including Microsoft Windows, macOS, Android, Linux, and FreeBSD. BOINC is free software released under the terms of the GNU Lesser General Public License (LGPL).

== History ==
BOINC was originally developed to manage the SETI@home project. David P. Anderson has said that he chose its name because he wanted something that was not "imposing", but rather "light, catchy, and maybe - like 'Unix' - a little risqué", so he "played around with various acronyms and settled on 'BOINC'".

The original SETI client was a non-BOINC software exclusively for SETI@home. It was one of the first volunteer computing projects, and not designed with a high level of security. As a result, some participants in the project attempted to cheat the project to gain "credits", while others submitted entirely falsified work. BOINC was designed, in part, to combat these security breaches.

The BOINC project started in February 2002, and its first version was released on April 10, 2002. The first BOINC-based project was Predictor@home, launched on June 9, 2004. In 2009, AQUA@home deployed multi-threaded CPU applications for the first time, followed by the first OpenCL application in 2010.

As of 7 February 2026, there are 26 projects on the official list. There are also, however, BOINC projects not included on the official list. Each year, an international BOINC Workshop is hosted to increase collaboration among project administrators. In 2021, the workshop was hosted virtually.

While not affiliated with BOINC officially, there have been several independent projects that reward BOINC users for their participation, including Charity Engine (sweepstakes based on processing power with prizes funded by private entities who purchase computational time of CE users), Bitcoin Utopia (now defunct), and Gridcoin (a blockchain which mints coins based on processing power).

== Design and structure ==
BOINC is software that can exploit the unused CPU and GPU cycles on computer hardware to perform scientific computing. In 2008, BOINC's website announced that Nvidia had developed a language called CUDA that uses GPUs for scientific computing. With NVIDIA's assistance, several BOINC-based projects (e.g., MilkyWay@home. SETI@home) developed applications that run on NVIDIA GPUs using CUDA. BOINC added support for the ATI/AMD family of GPUs in October 2009. The GPU applications run from 2 to 10 times faster than the former CPU-only versions. GPU support (via OpenCL) was added for computers using macOS with AMD Radeon graphic cards, with the current BOINC client supporting OpenCL on Windows, Linux, and macOS. GPU support is also provided for Intel GPUs, though work is sparse.

BOINC consists of a server system and client software that communicate to process and distribute work units and return results.

=== Mobile application ===
A BOINC app also exists for Android, allowing every person owning an Android device – smartphone, tablet and/or Kindle – to share their unused computing power. The user is allowed to select the research projects they want to support, if it is in the app's available project list.

By default, the application will allow computing only when the device is connected to a WiFi network, is being charged, and the battery has a charge of at least 90%. Some of these settings can be changed to users needs. Not all BOINC projects are available and some of the projects are not compatible with all versions of Android operating system or devices. For some projects, availability of work is intermittent. Currently available projects are Asteroids@home, BOINC Central, Einstein@Home, Moo! Wrapper, Moo! Wrapper, Rosetta@home, World Community Grid and Yoyo@home. As of February 2026, the mobile application can only be downloaded from the BOINC website or the F-Droid repository as the official Google Play store does not allow downloading and running executables not signed by the app developer and each BOINC project has their own executable files.

=== User interfaces ===
BOINC can be controlled remotely by remote procedure calls (RPC), from the command line, and from a BOINC Manager. BOINC Manager currently has two "views": the Advanced View and the Simplified GUI. The Grid View was removed in the 6.6.x clients as it was redundant. The appearance (skin) of the Simplified GUI is user-customizable, in that users can create their own designs.

=== Account managers ===
A BOINC Account Manager is an application that manages multiple BOINC project accounts across multiple computers (CPUs) and operating systems. Account managers were designed for people who are new to BOINC or have several computers participating in several projects. The account manager concept was conceived and developed jointly by GridRepublic and BOINC. Current and past account managers include:

- BAM! (BOINC Account Manager) (The first publicly available Account Manager, released for public use on May 30, 2006)
- GridRepublic (Follows the ideas of simplicity and neatness in account management)
- Charity Engine (Non-profit account manager for hire, uses prize draws and continuous charity fundraising to motivate people to join the grid)
- Science United (An account manager designed to make BOINC easier to use which automatically selects vetted BOINC projects for users based on desired research areas such as "medicine" or "physics")
- Dazzler (Open-source Account Manager, to ease institutional management resources)

=== Credit system ===
- The BOINC Credit System is designed to avoid bad hardware and cheating by validating results before granting credit.
- The credit management system helps to ensure that users are returning results which are both statistically and scientifically accurate.
- Online volunteer computing is a complicated and variable mix of long-term users, retiring users and new users with different personal aspirations.

== Projects ==
BOINC is used by many groups and individuals. Some BOINC projects are based at universities and research labs while others are independent areas of research or interest.

=== Active ===
Active Projects that have a Wikipedia page
Project name	Publications	Launched	Status	Operating System	GPU App	Sponsor	Category	Research Focus
climateprediction.net	152 papers	2003-12-09	307,359 volunteers	Windows, Linux, ARM, macOS	No	Oxford University	Climate change	Improve climate prediction models. Sub-project: Seasonal Attribution Project.
Einstein@Home	47 papers	2005-02-19	1,041,796 volunteers	Windows, Linux, ARM, macOS, Android	GPU CPU	University of Wisconsin–Milwaukee, Max Planck Institute	Astrophysics	Search for pulsars using radio signals and gravitational wave data
Gerasim@Home	8 papers	2007-02-10	6,811 volunteers	Windows, Linux	No	Southwest State University (Russia)	Multiple applications	Research in discrete mathematics and logic control systems
GoofyxGrid@Home		2016			No	Independent	Mathematics	Mathematically implement the Infinite monkey theorem
GPUGRID.net	53 papers	2007-12-05	46,874 volunteers	Windows, Linux, macOS	NVIDIA GPU only	Barcelona Biomedical Research Park	Molecular biology	Perform full-atom molecular simulations of proteins on Nvidia GPUs for biomedical research
iThena	2 papers	2019	507,079 + 180,789 volunteers	Windows, Linux, ARM	No	Cyber-Complex Foundation (Poland)	Internet	Measurements and analyses of global Internet architecture structures
LHC@home	71 papers	2004-01-09	178,623 volunteers	Windows, Linux, ARM, macOS, Android, FreeBSD	No	CERN	Physics	Help construct and test the Large Hadron Collider and search for fundamental particles
MilkyWay@home	27 papers	2007-07-07	250,447 volunteers	Windows, Linux, macOS	No	Rensselaer Polytechnic Institute	Astronomy	Create a simulation of the Milky Way galaxy using data from the Sloan Digital Sky Survey
PrimeGrid	3 papers	2005-06-12	353,261 volunteers	Windows, Linux, macOS	GPU CPU	Independent	Mathematics	Search for primes such as Generalized Fermat primes, 321 primes, Sierpiński numbers, Cullen-Woodall primes, Proth prime, and Sophie Germain primes. Subprojects include Seventeen or Bust, Riesel Sieve, and AP27 Search.
RALPH@Home	Rosetta@home	2006-02-15	5548 volunteers	Windows, Linux, ARM, macOS, Android	GPU CPU	University of Washington	Molecular biology	Test project for Rosetta@home
Rosetta@home	234 papers	2005-10-06	1,373,480 volunteers	Windows, Linux, ARM, macOS, Android	No	University of Washington	Molecular biology	Protein structure prediction for disease research
Tn-grid	8 papers	2013-12-19	3,201 volunteers	Windows, Linux, macOS	No	University of Trento	Genetics	Currently deploying gene@home work to expand gene networks
World Community Grid	77 papers	2004-11-16	85,119 volunteers	Windows, Linux, ARM, macOS, Android	GPU CPU	Krembil Research Institute	Multiple applications	Subprojects: Open Pandemics - COVID-19. Clean Energy Project, GO Drug Search for Leishmaniasis, Fight Against Malaria, Computing for Clean Water, Discovering Dengue Drugs - Together, OpenZika, Help Cure Muscular Dystrophy, Help Defeat Cancer, Help Conquer Cancer, Help Fight Childhood Cancer, Smash Childhood Cancer, Human Proteome Folding Project, Uncovering Genome Mysteries, FightAIDS@Home, Let's outsmart Ebola together, Mapping Cancer Markers, Help Stop TB.
Yoyo@home	9 papers	2007-07-19	94,236 volunteers	Windows, Linux, macOS, Android, ARM, Solaris, Sony Playstation 3	No	Independent	Multiple applications	Using the BOINC Wrapper with existing volunteer projects

=== Completed ===
Completed Projects that have a Wikipedia page
Project name	Publications	Launched	Status	Operating System	GPU app	Sponsor	Category	Research Focus
ABC@Home	3 papers	2006-11-21			No	Mathematical Institute of Leiden University	Mathematics	Find triples of the ABC conjecture
AQUA@home	4 papers	2008-12-10			GPU CPU	D-Wave Systems	Computer science	Predict the performance of Quantum computers
Artificial Intelligence System					No	Intelligence Realm Inc	Artificial intelligence	Simulate the brain using Hodgkin–Huxley models via an artificial neural network
Big and Ugly Rendering Project (BURP)	2 papers	2004-06-17			No	Independent	Rendering (computer graphics)	Use BOINC infrastructure with Blender (software) to render animated videos
Collatz Conjecture project		2009-01-06	67,719 volunteers	Windows, Linux, macOS	GPU CPU	Independent	Mathematics	Study the unsolved Collatz conjecture
Correlizer	6 papers	2011			No		Biology	Examining genome organization
Cosmology@Home	5 papers	2007-06-26	87,465 volunteers	Windows, Linux, macOS	No	Institut d'Astrophysique de Paris	Astronomy	Develop simulations that best describe The Universe
Docking@Home	20 papers	2006-09-11			No	University of Delaware	Molecular biology	Use the CHARMM program to model protein-ligand docking. The goal was the development of pharmaceutical drugs.
EDGeS@Home	13 papers	2009-10			No	MTA SZTAKI Laboratory of Parallel and Distributed Systems	Multiple applications	Support of scientific applications developed by the EGEE and EDGeS community
eOn	6 papers				No	University of Texas at Austin	Chemistry	Theoretical chemistry techniques to solve problems in condensed matter physics and materials science
Evolution@Home	6 papers				No		Evolutionary Biology	Improve understanding of evolutionary processes
FreeHAL		2006			No	Independent	Artificial intelligence	Compute information for software to imitate human conversation
HashClash	11 papers	2005-11-24			No	Eindhoven University of Technology	Cryptography	Find collisions in the MD5 hash algorithm
Ibercivis	18 papers	2008-06-22			No	Zaragoza, CETA-CIEMAT, CSIC, Coimbra	Multiple applications	Research in physics, material science and biomedicines
Leiden Classical	2 papers	2005-05-12			No	Leiden University	Chemistry	Classical mechanics for students and scientists
Malaria Control Project	26 papers	2006-12-19			No	Swiss Tropical and Public Health Institute	Model Diseases	Stochastic modelling of clinical epidemiology and the natural history of Plasmodium falciparum malaria
MindModeling@Home	6 papers	2007-07-07	24,574 volunteers	Windows, Linux, macOS	No	University of Dayton Research Institute and Wright State University	Cognitive science	Making cognitive models of the human mind
uFluids@Home	3 papers	2005-09-19			No	Purdue University	Physics, Aeronautics	A computer simulation of two-phase flow behavior in microgravity and micro fluidics
OProject@Home	paper	2012-08-13			No	Olin Library, Rollins College	Mathematics	Algorithm analysis. The library is open and available in the Code.google.com SVN repository.
orbit@home	paper	2008-04-03			No	Planetary Science Institute	Astronomy	Monitor near-earth asteroids
Pirates@home		2004-06-02			No	1 Vassar College 2 Spy Hill Research	Software testing	Mission 1: Test BOINC software and help to develop Einstein@Home screensaver Mission 2: Develop forum software for Interactions in Understanding the Universe
POEM@Home	5 papers	2007-13-11			No	University of Karlsruhe	Molecular biology	Model Protein folding using Anfinsen's dogma
Predictor@home	5 papers	2004-05-04			No	The Scripps Research Institute	Molecular biology	Test new methods of protein structure prediction and algorithms in the context of the Sixth Biannual CASP experiment
proteins@home	4 papers	2006-09-15			No	École polytechnique	Protein structure prediction	Contribute to a better understanding of many diseases and pathologies and to progress in Medicine and Technology
QMC@Home	7 papers	2006-03-03			No	University of Münster	Chemistry	Study the structure and reactivity of molecules using quantum chemistry and Monte Carlo techniques
Quake-Catcher Network	13 papers	2008-02-03			No	Stanford University, then University of Southern California	Seismology	Use accelerometers connected to personal computers and devices to detect earthquakes and to educate about seismology
Riesel Sieve					No		Mathematics	Prove that 509,203 is the smallest Riesel number by finding a prime of the form k × 2^{n} − 1 for all odd k smaller than 509,203
SAT@home	8 papers	2011-09			No	Siberian Branch of the Russian Academy of Sciences	Mathematics	Solve discrete problems by reducing them to the problem of satisfiability of Boolean formulas
SETI@home	12 papers	1999-05-17	1,808,938 volunteers	Windows, Linux, macOS, Android	GPU CPU	University of California, Berkeley	Astronomy	Analyzing radio frequencies from space to search for extraterrestrial life. Sub project: Astropulse
SETI@home beta	see above	2006-01-12			GPU CPU	University of California, Berkeley	Software testing	Test project for SETI@home
SIMAP	5 papers	2006-04-26			No	University of Vienna	Molecular biology	Investigated protein similarities
SLinCA@Home		2010-09-14			No	National Academy of Sciences of Ukraine	Physics	Research in physics and materials science
Spinhenge@home	3 papers				No	Technion – Israel Institute of Technology	genetic linkage	Used genetic linkage analysis to find disease resistant genes
TANPAKU	2 papers	2005-08-02			No	Tokyo University of Science	Molecular biology	Protein structure prediction using the Brownian dynamics method
The Lattice Project	16 papers	2004-06-30			No	University of Maryland, College Park	Life science	Multiple applications
theSkyNet	3 papers	2011-09-13			No	International Centre for Radio Astronomy Research	Astronomy	Analysis of radio astronomy data from telescopes

== See also ==
- List of volunteer computing projects
- List of free and open-source Android applications
- List of grid computing projects
- List of citizen science projects
- List of crowdsourcing projects
- 3G Bridge
- Africa@home
- Citizen Cyberscience Centre
- distributed.net
- Folding@home
- Great Internet Mersenne Prime Search
- grid.org
- Gridcoin
- BOSSA
