= GPUGRID.net =

BOINC based volunteer computing project researching molecular biology simulations

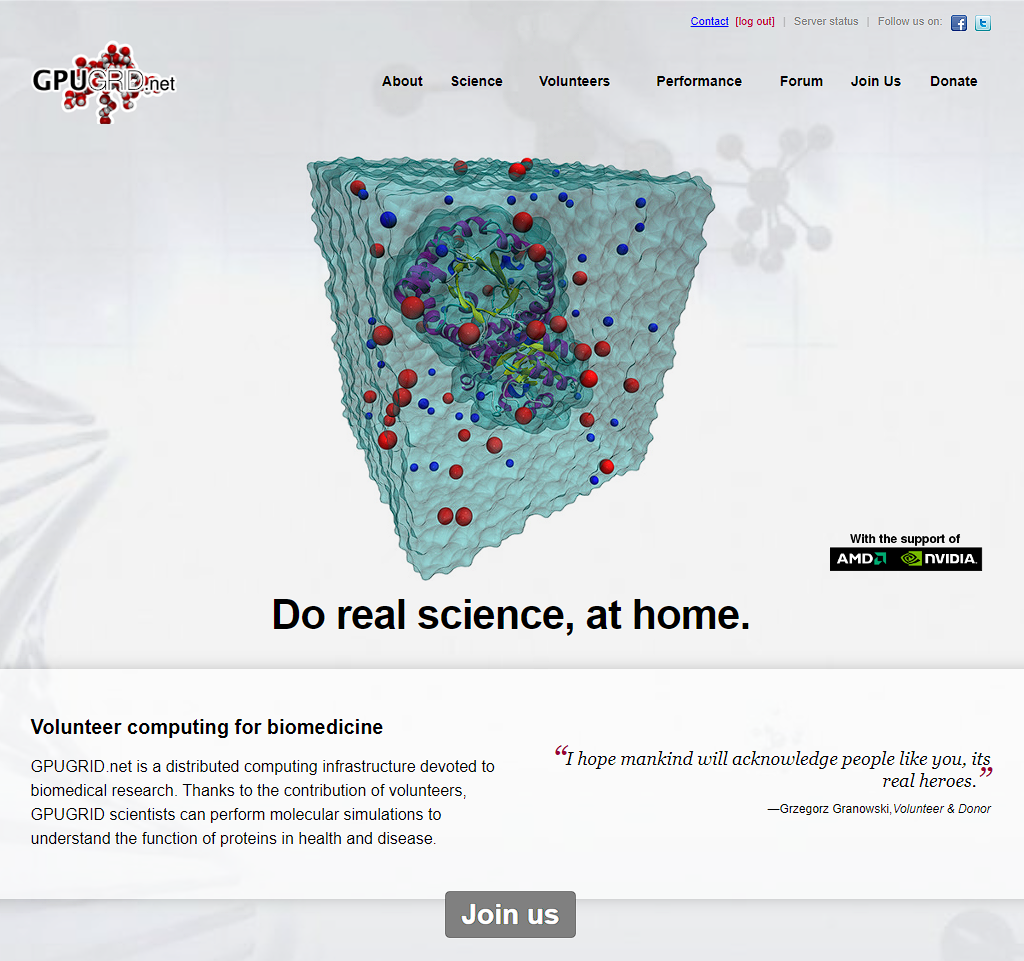
- GPUGrid.net webpage screenshot
- Developer(s): Multiscale Laboratory
- Initial release: May 12, 2007
- Operating system: Cross-platform
- Platform: BOINC
- License: Proprietary
- Website: www.gpugrid.net

GPUGRID is a volunteer computing project hosted by Pompeu Fabra University and running on the Berkeley Open Infrastructure for Network Computing (BOINC) software platform. It performs full-atom molecular biology simulations that are designed to run on Nvidia's CUDA-compatible graphics processing units.

== Former support for PS3s ==
Support for the PS3's Cell microprocessor and the subsequent PS3GRID project was dropped in 2009 due to updated firmware preventing the installation of required third-party software. This included Linux distributions that are required to run BOINC. The massive throughput of Nvidia GPUs has also made the PS3 client largely redundant. As of September 2009, a mid-range Nvidia GPU ran GPUGRID applications approximately five times faster than the Cell microprocessor.

== See also ==
- List of volunteer computing projects
- Molecular dynamics
- GPGPU
