= Predictor@home =

BOINC based volunteer computing project to predict protein structure

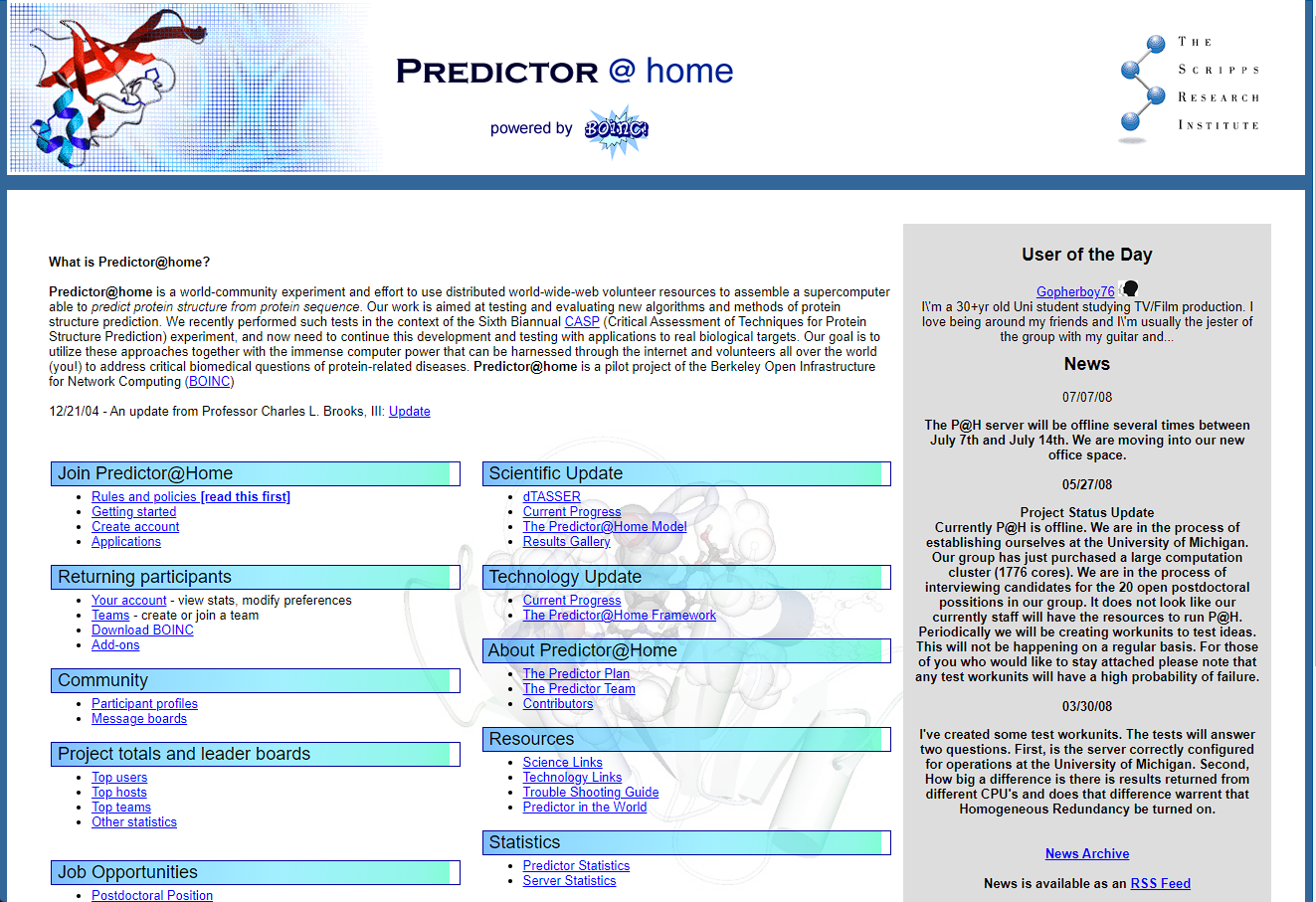
- Development status: Completed
- Platform: BOINC

Predictor@home was a volunteer computing project that used BOINC software to predict protein structure from protein sequence in the context of the 6th biannual CASP, or Critical Assessment of Techniques for Protein Structure Prediction. A major goal of the project was the testing and evaluating of new algorithms to predict both known and unknown protein structures.

Predictor@home was complementary to Folding@home. Whereas the latter aims to study the dynamics of protein folding, Predictor@home aimed to specify what the final tertiary structure will be. Also, the two projects differ significantly in the infrastructure they use. The project used BOINC software, whereas Folding@home maintains its own software completely outside of BOINC.

However, for a time, Predictor@home competed with other BOINC protein structure prediction projects, such as Rosetta@home. Each uses different methods of rapidly and reliably predicting the final tertiary structure.

Predictor@home is currently inactive.

== History ==
Predictor@home holds the distinction of being the first independent BOINC project to be launched. The project was set up and run by Michela Taufer at The Scripps Research Institute.

On September 6, 2006, Predictor@home was temporarily taken off line, with no new work units being sent out. In May, 2008, the project reverted to Alpha status while experimenting with new methods.

Over the summer of 2008, the project servers were moved to the University of Michigan and as of December 2008, the project had not sent out any work for some months. BOINC stats sites were unable to obtain updated XML data, as this had been suspended by the project team.

On June 10, 2009, the Predictor@home web site and forums were shut down.

== See also ==
- List of volunteer computing projects
- Rosetta@home
- SIMAP
- Grid computing
- Protein structure prediction
