= UFluids@Home =

BOINC based volunteer computing project researching microgravity and microfluidics

μFluids@Home
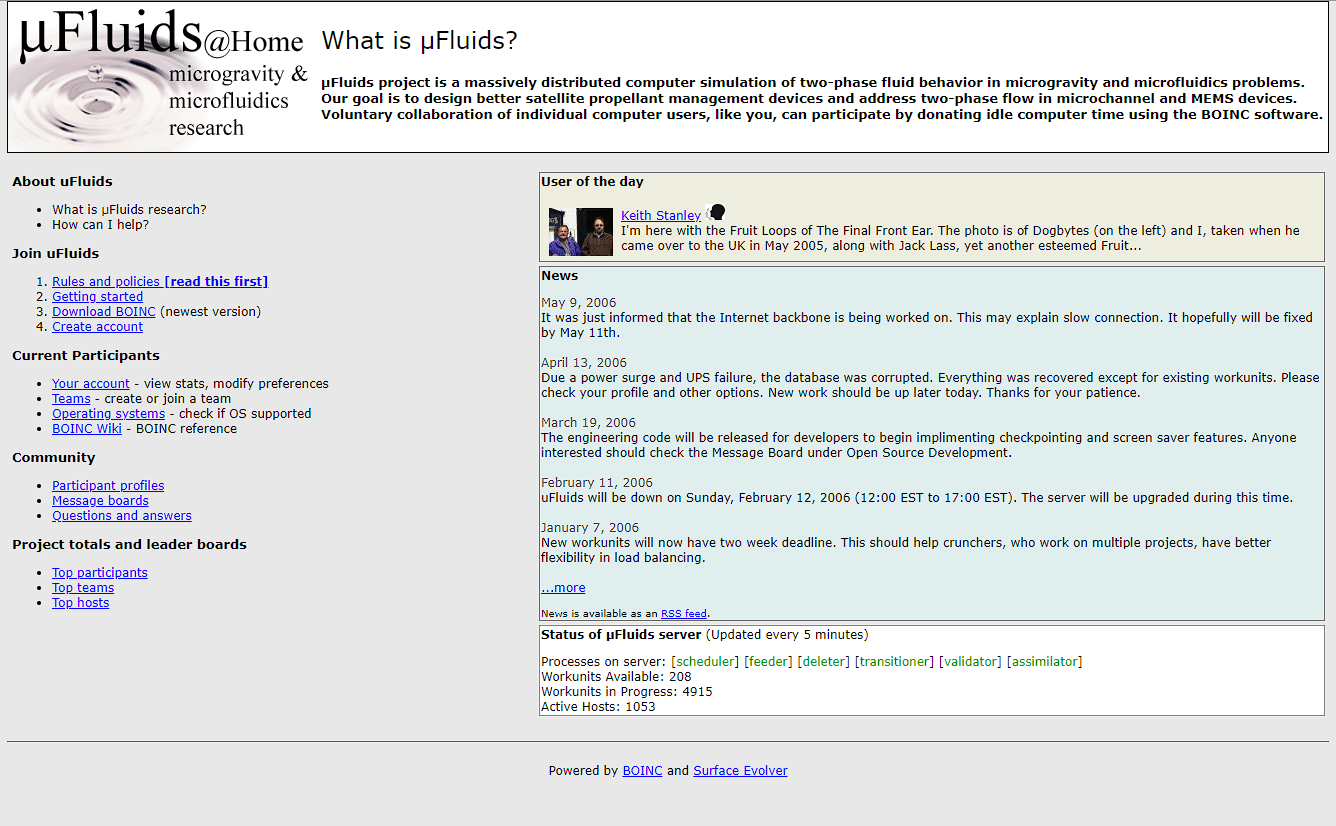
- Operating system: cross-platform
- Platform: BOINC
- Website: www.ufluids.net

μFluids@Home is a computer simulation of two-phase flow behavior in microgravity and microfluidics problems at Purdue University, using the Surface Evolver program.

== About ==
The project's purpose is to develop better methods for the management of liquid rocket propellants in microgravity, and to investigate two-phase flow in microelectromechanical systems, taking into account factors like surface tension. Systems using electrowetting, channel geometry, and hydrophobic or hydrophilic coatings to allow the smooth passage of fluids can then be designed. Such systems include compact medical devices, biosensors, and fuel cells.

== Computing platform ==
μFluids@Home uses the BOINC volunteer computing platform.

Application notes

- There is no screensaver.
- Work unit CPU times are generally less than 20 hours.
- Work units average in size around 500 kB.
- You must run many work units to get levels of credit comparable to SETI@home or climateprediction.net BOINC projects.
