= Docking@Home =

BOINC based volunteer computing project researching protein structure

- Developer(s): University of Delaware
- Operating system: Linux, macOS, and Windows
- Platform: BOINC
- Website: docking.cis.udel.edu

Docking@Home was a volunteer computing project hosted by the University of Delaware and running on the Berkeley Open Infrastructure for Network Computing (BOINC) software platform. It models protein-ligand docking using the CHARMM program. Volunteer computing allows an extensive search of protein-ligand docking conformations and selection of near-native ligand conformations are achieved by using ligand based hierarchical clustering. The ultimate aim was the development of new pharmaceutical drugs.

The project was retired on May 23, 2014.

== See also ==
- List of volunteer computing projects
