= POEM@Home =

German volunteer computing project (2007–2016)

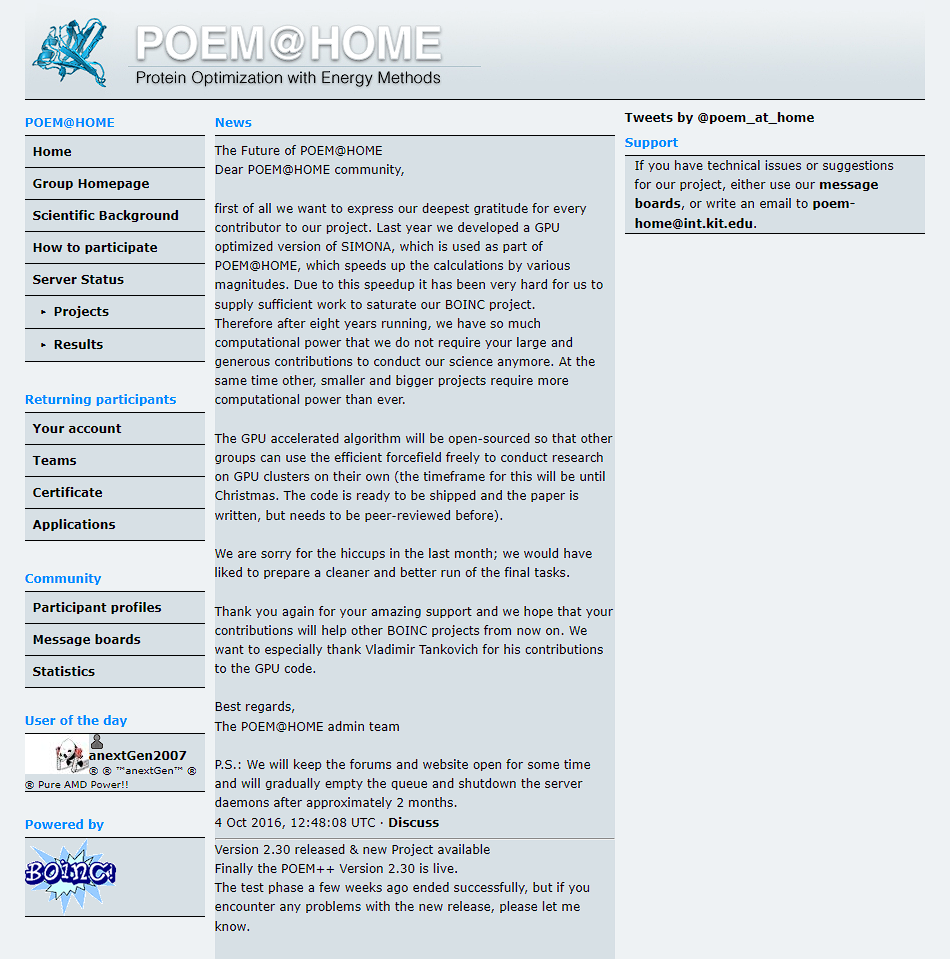
- Platform: BOINC

POEM@Home was a volunteer computing project hosted by the Karlsruhe Institute of Technology and running on the Berkeley Open Infrastructure for Network Computing (BOINC) software platform. It modeled protein folding using Anfinsen's dogma. POEM@Home was started in 2007 and, due to advances using GPUs that rendered the BOINC program redundant, concluded in October 2016. The POEM@home applications were proprietary.

== Scientific objectives ==
The project studied how protein structure determined protein function, predict a protein's structure from its amino acid sequence, investigated how proteins interact with each other, and understand how malfunctioning proteins can cause functional disorders. The resulting knowledge could then be used in the development of medical treatments.

== See also ==
- List of volunteer computing projects
