= FreeHAL =

BOINC based volunteer computing project

FreeHAL (former JEliza)
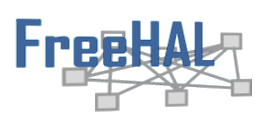

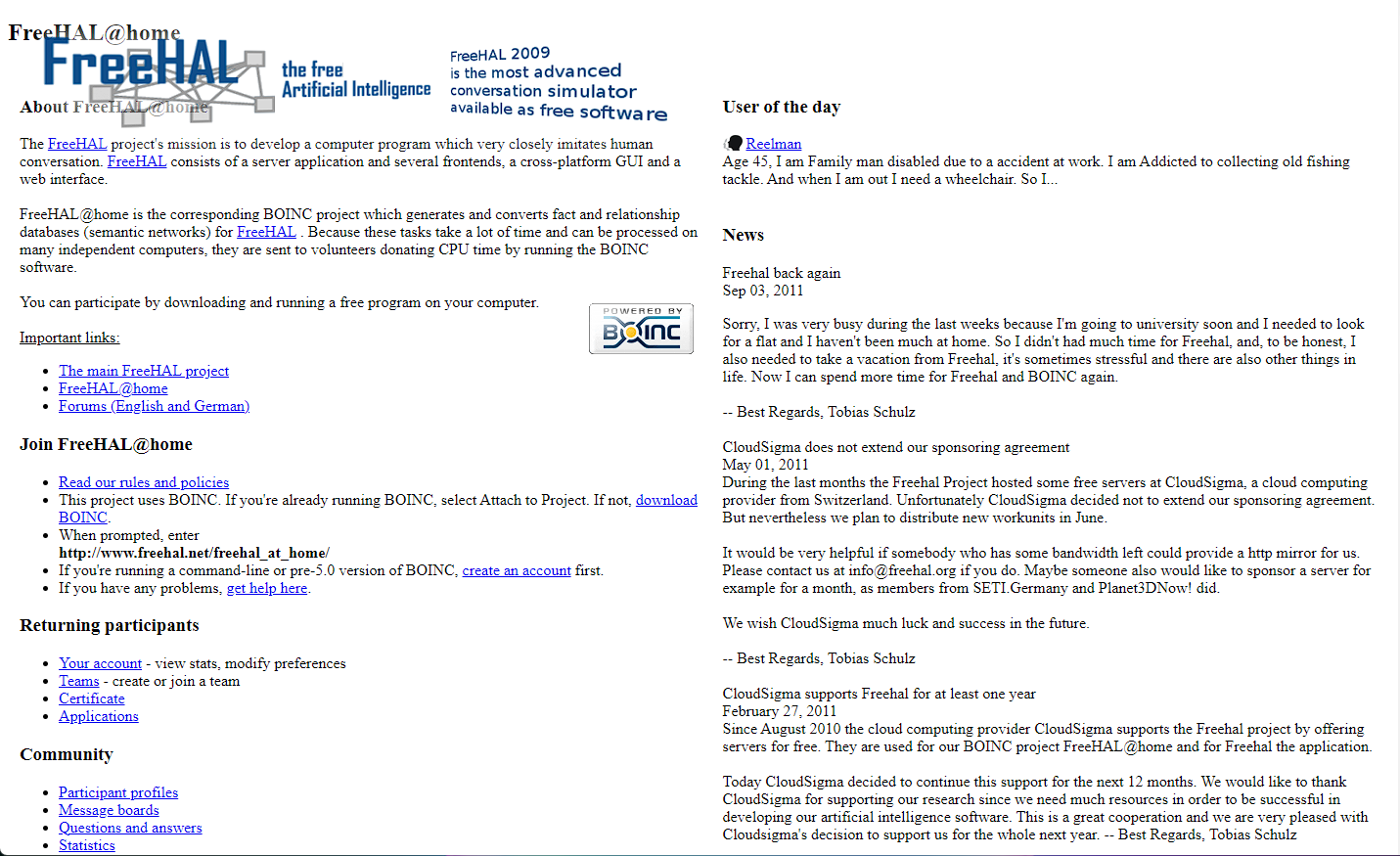
- Developer: Tobias Schulz
- Final release: Step 6 / April 8, 2011; 14 years ago
- Operating system: Linux, Microsoft Windows, UNIX, Mac OS X
- Type: Artificial Intelligence
- License: GNU GPL v3
- Website: freehal.github.io

FreeHAL was a volunteer computing project to build a self-learning chatbot. This project is no longer active.

Originally, the program was called JEliza referring to the chatbot ELIZA by Joseph Weizenbaum. The J stood for Java because JEliza has first been programmed in Java. In May 2008, the program has been renamed to FreeHAL because the programming language has changed. The name is related to the computer in the film 2001: A Space Odyssey.

FreeHAL uses a semantic network and technologies like pattern recognition, stemming, part of speech databases and Hidden Markov Models in order to imitate a human behaviour. FreeHAL learns autonomously. While communicating by keyboard, the program extends its database. Currently, English and German are supported.

By using the BOINC platform, new semantic networks for the program are built. FreeHAL@home appears to have terminated operations.

== Awards ==
In 2008, the program won the first prize in the category "Most Popular" at the Chatterbox Challenge, a yearly competition between different similar chatbots.

== Publications ==
There was an article about FreeHAL in the Linux Magazine, Issue 97 from December 2008. In the German magazine com!, the program was on the CD/DVD and in the list of the Top-10-Open-Source programs of the month.
