= EOn =

BOINC based volunteer computing project

eOn
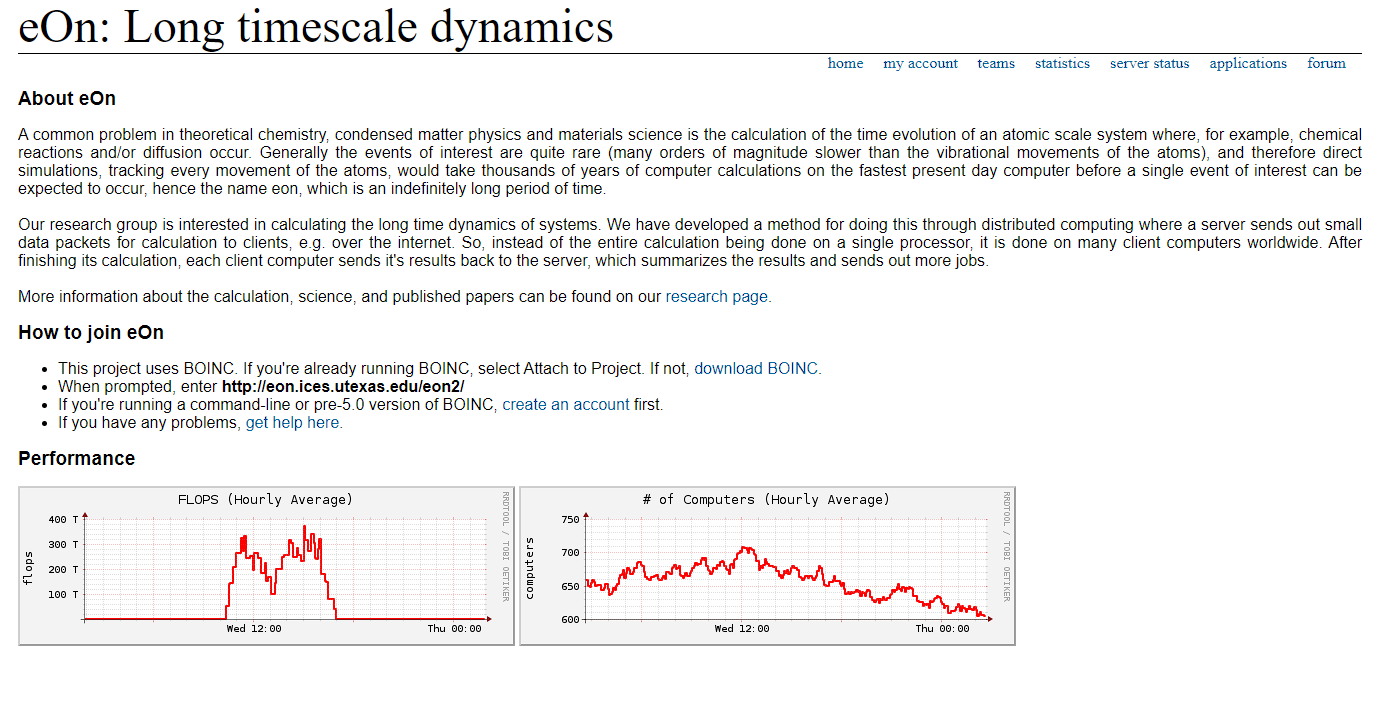
- Operating system: cross-platform
- Platform: BOINC
- Website: HomepageArchive

eOn was a volunteer computing project running on the Berkeley Open Infrastructure for Network Computing (BOINC) platform, which uses theoretical chemistry techniques to solve problems in condensed matter physics and materials science. It was a project of the Institute for Computational Engineering and Sciences at the University of Texas.

Traditional molecular dynamics can accurately model events that occur within a fraction of a millisecond. In order to model events that take place on much longer timescales, Eon combines transition state theory with kinetic Monte Carlo. The result is a combination of classical mechanics and quantum methods like density functional theory.

Since the generation of new work units depended on the results of previous units, the project could only give each host a few units at a time.

On May 26, 2014, it was announced that eOn would be retiring from BOINC.

== See also ==
- List of volunteer computing projects
