= Clean Energy Project =

BOINC-based volunteer computing project

- The Clean Energy Project Screensaver
- Operating system: cross-platform
- Platform: BOINC

The Clean Energy Project (CEP) was a virtual high-throughput discovery and design effort for the next generation of plastic solar cell materials that has finished. It studies millions of candidate structures to identify suitable compounds for the harvesting of renewable energy from the sun and for other organic electronic applications. It ran on the BOINC platform.

== Project purpose ==
The project searched for the most suitable organic compounds with which to make solar cells, the best polymeric membranes with which to make fuel cells, and how best to assemble the molecules for such devices.

== Current project status ==
On June 24, 2013, the Clean Energy Project released its database to the public and the research community. The release was featured on the White House Blog and by several news organizations including the MIT Technology Review. The database contains 150 million density functional theory calculations on 2.3 million molecules.

== Publications ==
- C. Amador-Bedolla, R. Olivares-Amaya, J. Hachmann, A. Aspuru-Guzik, Towards Materials Informatics for Organic Photovoltaics, in Informatics for Materials Science and Engineering, K. Rajan, Ed., Elsevier, Amsterdam (2013). In press.
- R. Olivares-Amaya, C. Amador-Bedolla, J. Hachmann, S. Atahan-Evrenk, R.S. Sánchez-Carrera, L. Vogt, A. Aspuru-Guzik, Accelerated Computational Discovery of High-performance Materials for Organic Photovoltaics by Means of Cheminformatics. Energy & Environmental Science 4 (2011), 4849–4861.
- J. Hachmann; R. Olivares-Amaya; S. Atahan-Evrenk; C. Amador-Bedolla; R.S. Sánchez-Carrera; A. Gold-Parker; L. Vogt; A.M. Brockway; A. Aspuru-Guzik (2011). "The Harvard Clean Energy Project: Large-Scale Computational Screening and Design of Organic Photovoltaics on the World Community Grid" (PDF). The Journal of Physical Chemistry Letters. 2 (17): 2241–2251. doi:10.1021/jz200866s. S2CID 54001464.
- A.N. Sokolov, S. Atahan-Evrenk, R. Mondal, H.B. Akkerman, R.S. Sánchez-Carrera, S. Granados-Focil, J. Schrier, S.C.B. Mannsfeld, A.P. Zoombelt, Z. Bao, A. Aspuru-Guzik, From Computational Discovery to Experimental Characterization of a High Hole Mobility Organic Crystal. Nature Communications 2 (2011), 437.
- R.S. Sánchez-Carrera; S. Atahan; J. Schrier; A. Aspuru-Guzik (2010). "Theoretical Characterization of the Air-Stable, High-Mobility Dinaphtho[2,3- b :2′3′- f ]thieno[3,2- b ]-thiophene Organic Semiconductor". The Journal of Physical Chemistry C. 114 (5): 2334–2340. doi:10.1021/jp910102f. S2CID 35899420.
- R.S. Sánchez-Carrera; M.C. Ruiz Delgado; C. Capel Ferrón; R. Malavé Osuna; V. Hernández; J.T. López Navarrete; A. Aspuru-Guzik (October 2010). "Optical absorption and emission properties of end-capped oligothienoacenes: A joint theoretical and experimental study". Organic Electronics. 11 (10): 1701–1712. doi:10.1016/j.orgel.2010.07.001. S2CID 21724802.

== See also ==
- BOINC
- List of volunteer computing projects
- World Community Grid
