= AQUA@home =

BOINC based volunteer computing project researching quantum computing

- Graphic visualization of Aqua@Home's multithreaded IQUANA Core running a Quantum Monte Carlo simulation
- Developer(s): D-Wave Systems
- Operating system: Cross-platform
- Platform: BOINC
- Type: Volunteer computing
- Website: aqua.dwavesys.com

AQUA@home was a volunteer computing project operated by D-Wave Systems that ran on the Berkeley Open Infrastructure for Network Computing (BOINC) software platform. It ceased functioning in August 2011. Its goal was to predict the performance of superconducting adiabatic quantum computers on a variety of problems arising in fields ranging from materials science to machine learning. It designed and analyzed quantum computing algorithms, using Quantum Monte Carlo techniques.

AQUA@home was the first BOINC project to provide multi-threaded applications. It was also the first project to deploy an OpenCL test application under BOINC.
