= Spinhenge@Home =

BOINC based volunteer computing project

Spinhenge@home
- Spinhenge@home graphics
- Platform: BOINC

Spinhenge@home was a volunteer computing project on the BOINC platform, which performs extensive numerical simulations concerning the physical characteristics of magnetic molecules. It is a project of the Bielefeld University of Applied Sciences, Department of Electrical Engineering and Computer Science, in cooperation with the University of Osnabrück and Ames Laboratory.

The project began beta testing on September 1, 2006, and used the Metropolis Monte Carlo algorithm to calculate and simulate spin dynamics in nanoscale molecular magnets.

On September 28, 2011, a hiatus was announced while the project team reviewed results and upgraded hardware. As of July 10, 2022 the hiatus continues and it is likely that the project has been closed down permanently.

== See also ==
- Spintronics
- BOINC
- List of volunteer computing projects
