= Orbit@home =

BOINC based volunteer computing project researching asteroid orbits

orbit@home
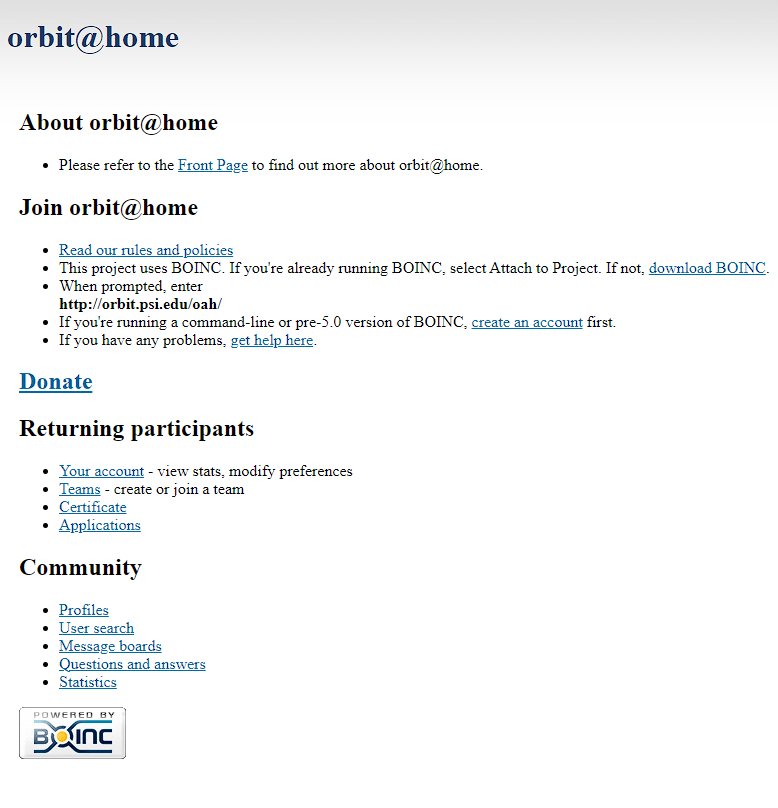
- Platform: BOINC

orbit@home was a BOINC-based volunteer computing project of the Planetary Science Institute. It uses the "Orbit Reconstruction, Simulation and Analysis" framework to optimize the search strategies that are used to find near-Earth objects.

On March 4, 2008, orbit@home completed the installation of its new server and officially opened to new members. On April 11, orbit@home launched a Windows version of their client. On February 16, 2013, the project was halted due to lack of grant funding. However, on July 23, 2013, the Orbit@home project was selected for funding by NASA's Near Earth Object Observation program. It was announced that orbit@home is to resume operations sometime in 2014 or 2015. As of July 13, 2018, orbit@home is offline according to its website, and the upgrade announcement has been removed.

== See also ==
- List of volunteer computing projects
