= Help Conquer Cancer =

World Community Grid sub-project

Help Conquer Cancer Screensaver

Help Conquer Cancer is a volunteer computing project that runs on the BOINC platform. It is a joint project of the Ontario Cancer Institute and the Hauptman-Woodward Medical Research Institute. It is also the first project under World Community Grid to run with a GPU counterpart.

== Project Purpose ==
The goal is to enhance the efficiency of protein X-ray crystallography, which will enable researchers to determine the structure of many cancer-related proteins faster. This will lead to improving the understanding of the function of these proteins, and accelerate the development of new pharmaceutical drugs.

== See also ==
- BOINC
- List of volunteer computing projects
- World Community Grid
