= MindModeling@Home =

BOINC based volunteer computing project researching cognitive science

- interactive screensaver
- Initial release: March 17, 2007
- Development status: Inactive
- Operating system: Cross-platform
- Platform: BOINC
- Average performance: 0 GFLOPS,
- Active users: 0
- Total users: 0
- Active hosts: 0
- Total hosts: 0
- Website: mindmodeling.org

MindModeling@Home is an inactive non-profit, volunteer computing research project for the advancement of cognitive science. MindModeling@Home is hosted by Wright State University and the University of Dayton in Dayton, Ohio.

In BOINC, it is in the area of Cognitive Science and category called Cognitive science and artificial intelligence. It can only operate on a 64-bit operating system, preferably on a computer with multiple cores, running a Microsoft Windows, Mac OS X, or Linux operating system. This project is not compatible with mobile devices, unlike other projects on BOINC.

== Research focus ==
- N-2 Repetition: understanding how people have a harder time returning to a task from another one
- Observing how people read through their eye movement for the purpose of helping people reduce eye strain and processing what they read better and faster.
- Modeling decision-making: resolving around decisions made from visual processing (focus and filtering)
- Integrated Learning Models (ILM) to create algorithms based on how people learn and make decisions
- How the brain performs tasks sequentially and simultaneously by measuring its blood flow

== Problems ==
- Its status is inactive. However, it is "not down or closed," as its servers are still running.
- The projects are long; prolonged amounts of computing time can overheat a computer. The solution is to stop work on the project until the computer cools down.
- It is subject to power outages, as seen on October 7, 2018
- When the website will be out of beta mode is unknown, as it has been in beta since 2007

== Scientific results ==
1. Godwin H.J., Walenchok S. et al. Faster than the speed of rejection: Object identification processes during visual search for multiple targets. J Exp Psychol Hum Percept Perform. 41–4, (2016).
2. Moore L. R., Gunzelmann G. An interpolation approach for fitting computationally intensive models. Cognitive Systems Research 19, (2014).
3. Moore L.R. Cognitive model exploration and optimization: a new challenge for computational science. Comput Math Organ Theory 17, 296–313. (2011).
4. Moore L.R., Kopala M., Mielke T. et al. Simultaneous performance exploration and optimized search with volunteer computing. 19th ACM International Symposium on High Performance Distributed Computing, (2010).
5. Harris J., Gluck K.A., Moore L.R. MindModeling@Home. . . and Anywhere Else You Have Idle Processors. 9th International Conference on Cognitive Modelling, (2009).
6. Gluck K., Scheutz M. Combinatorics meets processing power: Large-scale computational resources for BRIMS. 16th Conference on Behavior Representation in Modeling and Simulation, BRIMS. 1. 73–83. (2007).

== See also ==
- List of volunteer computing projects
