= Cosmology@Home =

BOINC based volunteer computing project galaxy simulation

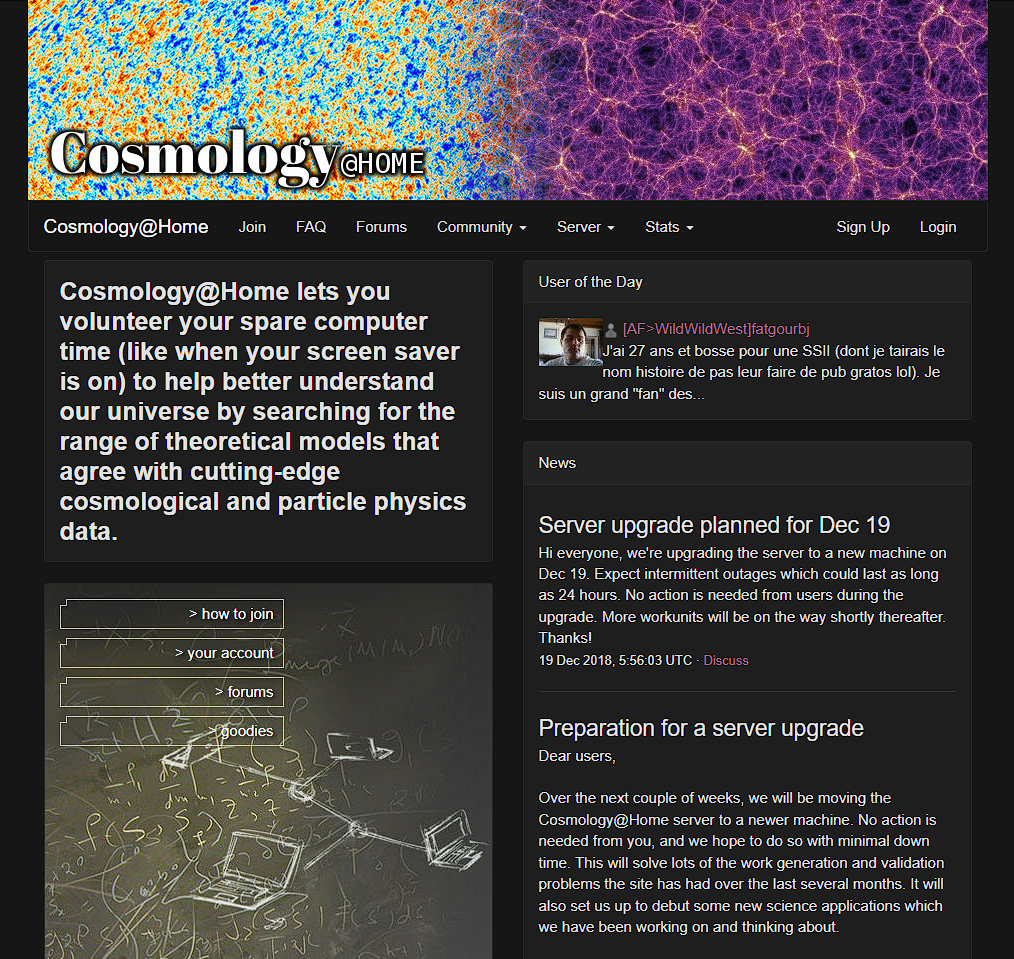
- Operating system: cross-platform
- Platform: BOINC
- Website: www.cosmologyathome.org

Cosmology@Home was a volunteer computing project that used the BOINC platform and was formerly run at the Departments of Astronomy and Physics at the University of Illinois at Urbana-Champaign. The project has moved to the Institut Lagrange de Paris and the Institut d'Astrophysique de Paris, both of which are located in the Pierre and Marie Curie University.

== Goals ==
The goal of Cosmology@Home is to compare theoretical models of the universe to the data measured to date and search for the model that best matches it. Other goals may include:

- results from Cosmology@Home can help design future cosmological observations and experiments.
- results from Cosmology@Home can help prepare for the analysis of future data sets, e.g. from the Planck spacecraft.

== Science ==
The goal of Cosmology@Home is to search for the model that best describes our Universe and to find the range of models that agree with the available astronomical and particle physics data. The models generated by Cosmology@Home can be compared to measurements of the universe's expansion speed from the Hubble Space Telescope as well as fluctuations in the Cosmic microwave background as measured by the Wilkinson Microwave Anisotropy Probe.

== Method ==
Cosmology@Home uses an innovative way of using machine learning to effectively parallelize a large computational task that involves many inherently sequential calculations over a substantial number of distributed computers.

For any given class of theoretically possible models of the Universe, Cosmology@Home generates tens of thousands of example Universes and packages the cosmological parameters describing these Universes as work units. Each work unit represents a single Universe. When the work unit is requested by a participating computer, this computer simulates this Universe from the Big Bang until today. The result of this simulation is a list of observable properties of this Universe.

This result is then sent back and archived at the Cosmology@Home server. When a sufficient number of example Universes have been simulated, a machine learning algorithm called Pico, which was developed by the project scientists of Cosmology@Home for this purpose, learns from these example calculations how to do the simulation for any Universe similar to the example Universes. The difference is that Pico takes a few milliseconds per calculation rather than several hours. Training Pico on 20,000 examples takes about 30 minutes. Once Pico is trained, it can run a full comparison of the class of models (which involves hundreds of thousands of model calculations) with the observational data in a few hours on a standard CPU.

The Cosmology@Home application is proprietary.

== Milestones ==
- 2007-06-30 Project launches for closed alpha testing - invitation only.
- 2007-08-23 Project opens registration for public alpha testing.
- 2007-11-05 Project enters beta testing stage.
- 2016-12-15 Project moved to the Institut Lagrange de Paris and the Institut d'astrophysique de Paris, both of which are located at the Pierre and Marie Curie University.

== See also ==
- List of volunteer computing projects
- Berkeley Open Infrastructure for Network Computing (BOINC)
