= Render farm =

System for rendering computer images

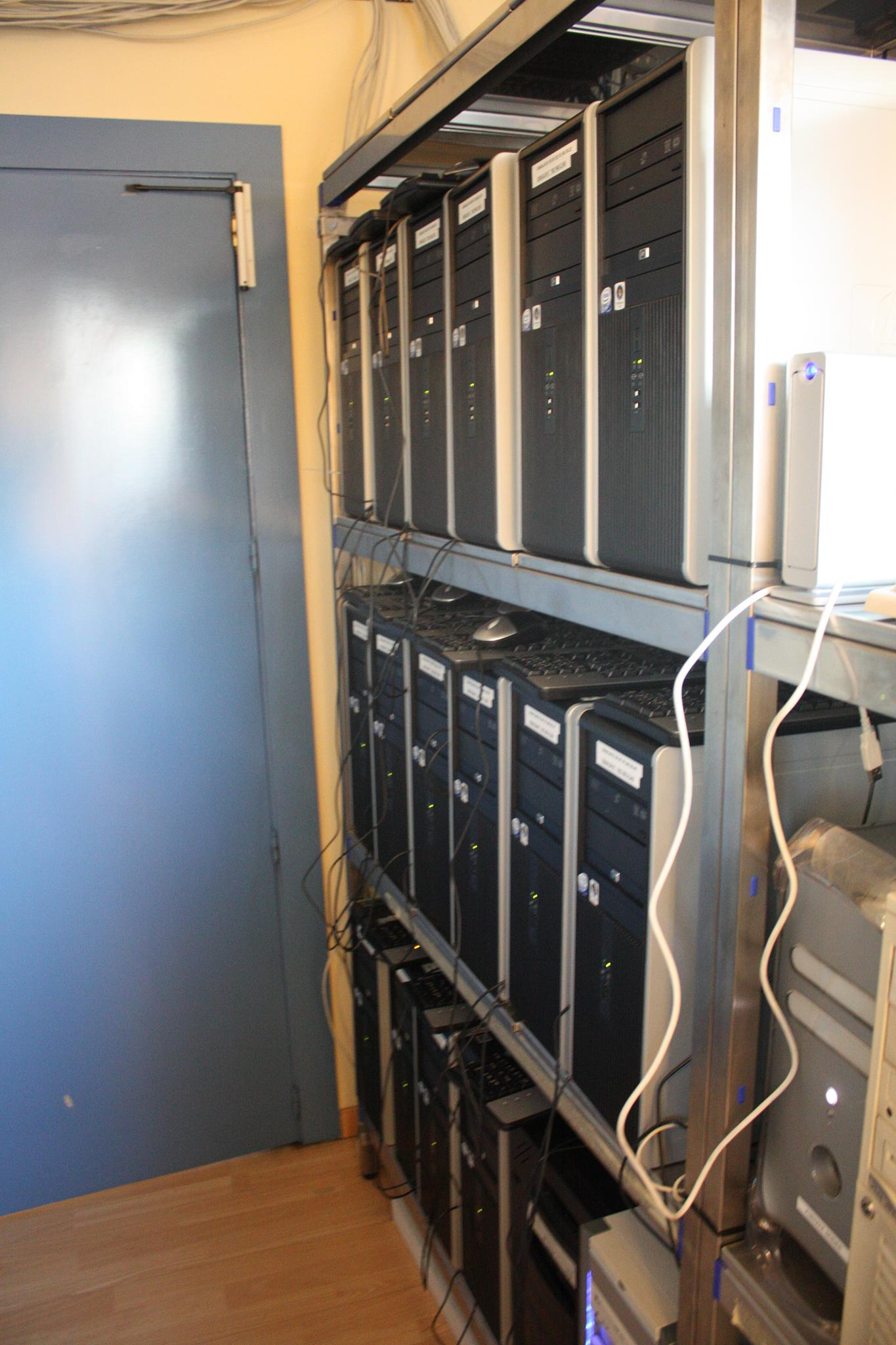
Render farm in Madrid, 2008

A render farm is a high-performance computer system, e.g. a computer cluster, built to render computer-generated imagery (CGI), typically for film and television visual effects.

A render farm is different from a render wall, which is a networked, tiled display used for real-time rendering. The rendering of images is a highly parallelizable activity, as frames and sometimes tiles can be calculated independently of the others, with the main communication between processors being the upload of the initial source material, such as models and textures, and the download of the finished images.

== Render capacity ==
Over the decades, advances in computer capability have allowed an image to take less time to render. However, the increased computation is appropriated to meet demands to achieve state-of-the-art image quality. While simple images can be produced rapidly, more realistic and complicated higher-resolution images can now be produced in more reasonable amounts of time.

The time spent producing images can be limited by production time-lines and deadlines, and the desire to create high-quality work drives the need for increased computing power, rather than simply wanting the same images created faster. Projects such as the Big and Ugly Rendering Project have been available for rendering images using Blender across both widely distributed and local networks.

== Management ==
To manage large farms, a queue manager is required that automatically distributes processes to the many processors. Each "process" could be the rendering of one full image, a few images, or even a sub-section (or tile) of an image. The software is typically a client–server package that facilitates communication between the processors and the queue manager, although some queues have no central manager.

Some common features of queue managers are: re-prioritization of the queue, management of software licenses, and algorithms to best optimize throughput based on various types of hardware in the farm. Software licensing handled by a queue manager might involve dynamic allocation of licenses to available CPUs or even cores within CPUs. A tongue-in-cheek job title for systems engineers who work primarily in the maintenance and monitoring of a render farm is a render wrangler, to further the "farm" theme. This job title can be seen in film credits.

Beyond on-site render farms, cloud-based render farm options have been facilitated by the rise of high-speed Internet access, and cloud-based rendering has grown in popularity for computationally intensive, time-consuming render work. Many cloud computing services, including some dedicated to rendering, offer to render farm services that bill only for processor time used. Understanding the cost or processing time required to complete rendering is unpredictable, so render farms often bill using GHz per hour. Those considering outsourcing their renders to a farm or to the cloud can do a number of things to improve their predictions and reduce their costs.

These services eliminate the need for a customer to build and maintain their own rendering solution. Another phenomenon is collaborative rendering, in which users join a network of animators who contribute their processing power to the group. However, this has technological and security limitations. Some cloud rendering farms have been developed over a long period of time and are TPN certified, which is a relatively authoritative certification in terms of security performance.

== Cloud-based render farms ==
Cloud-based render farms leverage the scalability and flexibility of cloud computing to offer on-demand rendering services, allowing users to distribute tasks across a vast network of virtualized servers.

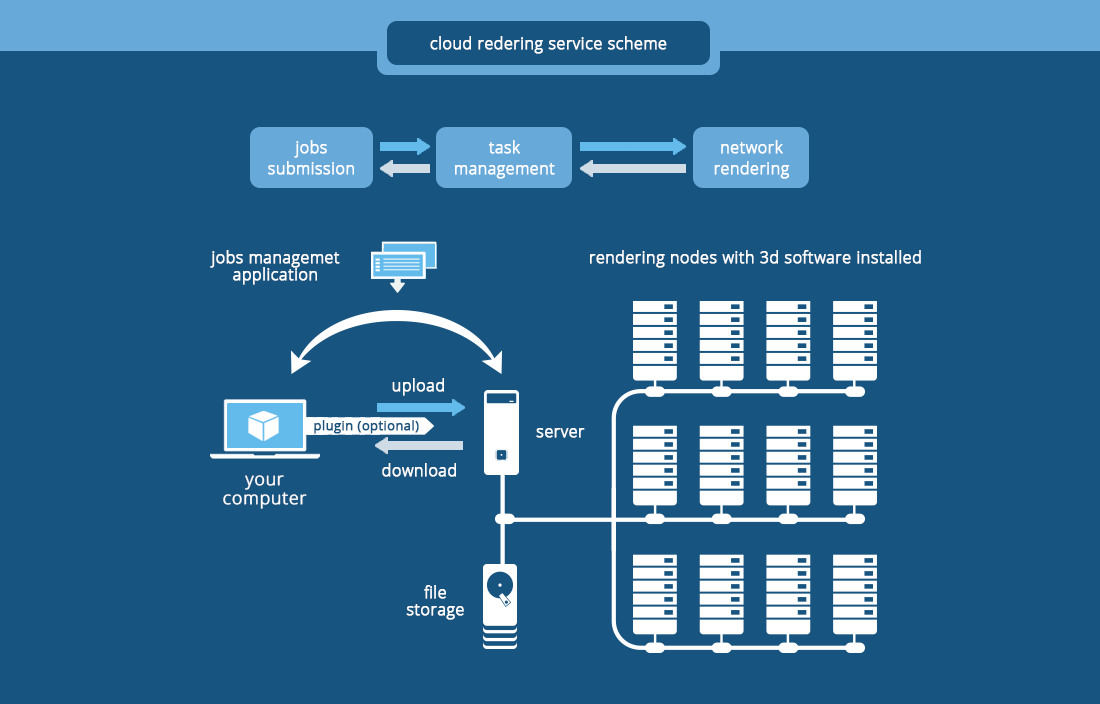
A graphic illustrating the Cloud-based render farm pipeline from file transference to the downloading of the rendered frames.

This approach provides significant advantages, such as the ability to scale resources dynamically, cost efficiency through a pay-as-you-go model, and accessibility from any location with an internet connection. These services integrate seamlessly with existing production pipelines, supporting various 3D software and rendering engines, and are increasingly favored for their ability to handle complex projects quickly without the need for expensive on-site hardware.

However, cloud-based render farms also present challenges, including the time required to upload large files, potential cost escalation for extensive projects, and dependency on reliable internet connectivity. Security remains a critical concern, with reputable providers offering robust measures to protect intellectual property. Despite these challenges, cloud-based rendering is becoming a vital tool in industries like film and gaming, offering a flexible and powerful alternative to traditional render farms.

== See also ==
- Parallel rendering
- Queue
- Server farm
