= GridRepublic =

BOINC Account Manager for volunteer computing projects

GridRepublic non-profit
- Founded: 2004
- Founder: Matthew Blumberg
- Purpose: Charity
- Location: Brooklyn, New York, United States
- Origins: USA
- Region served: Global
- Key people: Matthew Blumberg
- Website: www.gridrepublic.org

GridRepublic software
- Developer: GridRepublic in coordination with BOINC
- Stable release: 5.10.30 (Win), 5.2.5 (Mac) / July 18, 2009; 17 years ago
- Operating system: Cross-platform
- Type: Grid computing and Volunteer computing
- Website: www.gridrepublic.org

GridRepublic is a BOINC Account Manager. It focuses on creating a clean and simple way to join and interact with BOINC. GridRepublic was started with a mission to raise public awareness and participation in volunteer computing with BOINC. GridRepublic was formed in 2004 by Matthew Blumberg as a mechanism to control the multiple projects from one place. The code for the BOINC software had to be redesigned to allow for the Account Manager system to be implemented.

GridRepublic's website has won numerous awards including being named finalist at the 2007 SXSW Interactive Festival and the 2008 Stockholm Challenge. GridRepublic has also been the recipients of a Google Grant allowing for advertising through Google.

== Projects ==
GridRepublic supports a wide range of the BOINC projects. The list of supported projects and the development status of projects are periodically updated. Some of its popular projects include:

Climateprediction.net
Climate change modeling on personal computers
Einstein@home
Pulsar stars from LIGO and GEO data
Rosetta@home
Protein folding research
SETI@home
Searching radio and light data for signs of intelligent life

== Software ==
GridRepublic is a non-profit organisation, an online application, and software. The software is open source and a customized version of BOINC.
