= Help Cure Muscular Dystrophy =

BOINC based World Community Grid volunteer computing subproject

WCG screensaver, Help Cure Muscular Dystrophy - Phase 2

Help Cure Muscular Dystrophy is a volunteer computing project that runs on the BOINC platform.

It is a joint effort of the French muscular dystrophy charity, L'Association française contre les myopathies; and L'Institut de biologie moléculaire et cellulaire (Molecular and Cellular Biology Institute).

== Project purpose ==
Help Cure Muscular Dystrophy studies the function of various proteins that are produced by the two hundred genes known to be involved in the production of neuromuscular proteins by modelling the protein-protein interactions of the forty thousand relevant proteins that are listed in the Protein Data Bank. More specifically, it models how a protein would be affected when another protein or a ligand docks with it.

== Scientific publications ==
- Decrypting protein surfaces by combining evolution, geometry, and molecular docking. Proteins: Structure, Function, and Bioinformatics (2019).
- Hidden partners: Using cross-docking calculations to predict binding sites for proteins with multiple interactions. Proteins: Structure, Function, and Bioinformatics (2018).
- Protein social behavior makes a stronger signal for partner identification than surface geometry. Proteins: Structure, Function, and Bioinformatics (2017).
- Great interactions: How binding incorrect partners can teach us about protein recognition and function. Proteins: Structure, Function, and Bioinformatics (2016).
- Protein-Protein Interactions in a Crowded Environment: An Analysis via Cross-Docking Simulations and Evolutionary Information. PLOS Computational Biology (2013).
- From Dedicated Grid to Volunteer Grid: Large Scale Execution of a Bioinformatics Application. Journal of Grid Computing (2009).
- Joint Evolutionary Trees: A Large-Scale Method To Predict Protein Interfaces Based on Sequence Sampling. PLOS Computational Biology (2009).
- Identification of Protein Interaction Partners and Protein–Protein Interaction Sites. Journal of Molecular Biology (2008).

== See also ==
- BOINC
- List of volunteer computing projects
- Muscular dystrophy
- World Community Grid
