= Simap.ch =

Swiss government procurement website

simap.ch is the official gazette for government procurement publications in Switzerland. It is published online by an association established jointly by the Swiss Confederation and the cantons of Switzerland. The name is an acronym for système d'information sur les marchés publics en Suisse, "information system on government procurement in Switzerland".

Notices published on simap.ch include requests for tender, requests for information, and contract awards by Swiss federal, cantonal and municipal authorities and public enterprises as provided for by law. Most notices are also republished in the European Union's Tenders Electronic Daily, based on agreements between Switzerland and the EU.

By 2019, simap.ch was to have been renewed based on e-procurement software. In this form, simap.ch was intended to allow public authorities in Switzerland to conduct procurement procedures entirely on a digital basis. That project was canceled and rescheduled for 2023.
