= Astropulse =

BOINC based volunteer computing SETI@home subproject

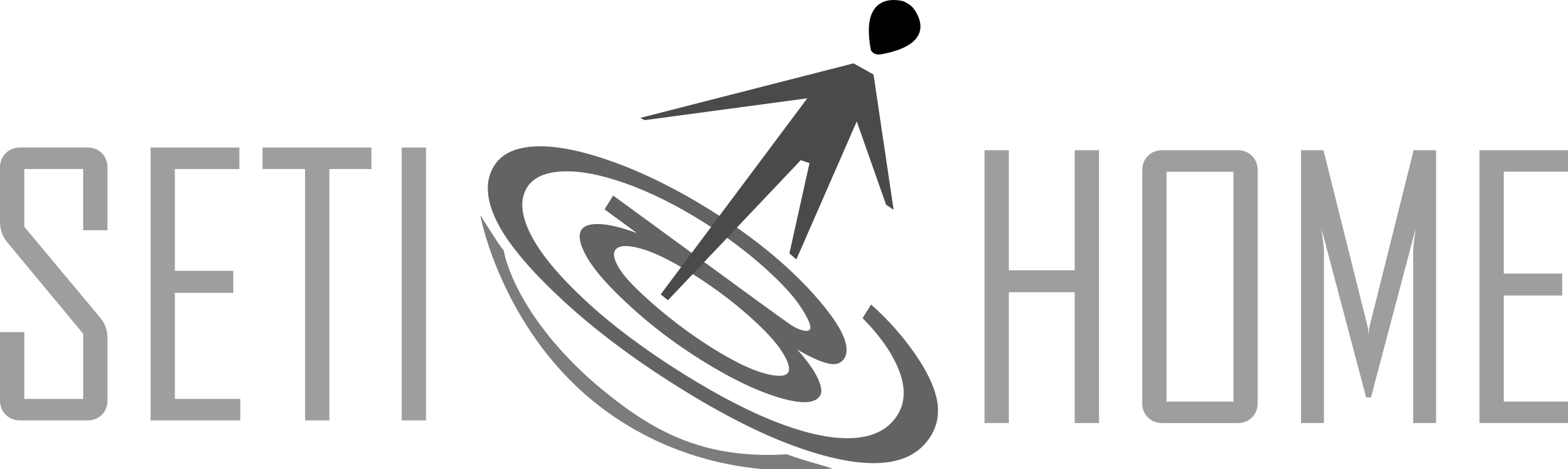

- SETI@home Astropulse screensaver
- Developer: University of California, Berkeley
- Initial release: July 2008 (public release)
- Platform: Cross-platform
- Available in: English
- Type: Volunteer computing
- License: GNU GPL
- Website: setiathome.ssl.berkeley.edu

Astropulse is a volunteer computing project to search for primordial black holes, pulsars, and extraterrestrial intelligence (ETI). Volunteer resources are harnessed through the Berkeley Open Infrastructure for Network Computing (BOINC) platform. In 1999, the Space Sciences Laboratory launched SETI@home, which relied on a network of desktop computers around the world to provide massively parallel computation. SETI@home utilizes recorded data from the Arecibo radio telescope and searches for narrow-bandwidth radio signals from space, signifying the presence of extraterrestrial technology. It was soon recognized that this same data might be scoured for other signals of value to the astronomy and physics community.

== Development ==
For about 6 years, Astropulse existed in an experimental beta testing phase not available to the general community. In July 2008, Astropulse was integrated into SETI@home, so that the massive network of SETI participants could also contribute to the search for other astronomical signals of value. Astropulse also makes contributions to the search for ET: first, project proponents believe it may identify a different type of ET signal not identified by the original SETI@Home algorithm; second, proponents believe it may create additional support for SETI by providing a second possible concrete result from the overall search project.

Final development of Astropulse has been a two-part endeavor. The first step was to complete the Astropulse C++ core that can successfully identify a target pulse. Upon completion of that program, the team created a trial dataset that contained a hidden pulse, which the completed program successfully found, thus confirming the ability of the Astropulse core to successfully identify target pulses. Since July 2008, research has focused on a series of refinements to the beta version which are then rolled out to the full universe of SETI participants. At the programming level, developers first seek to assure that new versions are compatible with a variety of platforms, after which the refined version is optimized for greater speed. As of April, 2009, Astropulse is testing beta version 5.05.

The future of the project depends on extended funding to SETI@home.

The BOINC idea is to divide (split) large blocks of data into smaller units, each of which can be distributed to individual participating work stations. To this end, the project then began to embed the Astropulse core into the SETI beta client and began to distribute real data, split into Astropulse work units, to a team of beta testers. The challenge has been to assure that the Astropulse core will work seamlessly on a broad array of operating systems. Current research focuses on implementing algorithm refinements that eliminate or reduce false positives.

== Scientific research ==
Astropulse searches for both single pulses and regularly repeating pulses. This experiment represents a new strategy for SETI, postulating microsecond timescale pulses as opposed to longer pulses or narrowband signals. They may also discover pulsars and exploding primordial black holes, both of which would emit brief wideband pulses. The primary purpose of the core Astropulse algorithm is coherent de-dispersion of the microsecond radio pulses for which Astropulse is searching. Dispersion of a signal occurs as the pulse passes through the interstellar medium (ISM) plasma, because the high frequency radiation goes slightly faster than the lower frequency radiation. Thus, the signal arrives at the radio-telescope dispersed depending upon the amount of ISM plasma between the Earth and the source of the pulse. Dedispersion is computationally intensive, thus lending itself to the distributed computing model.

Astropulse utilizes the distributed computing power of SETI@home, delegating computational sub-tasks to hundreds of thousands of volunteers' computers, to gain advantages in sensitivity and time resolution over previous surveys. Wideband pulses would be "chirped" by passage through the interstellar medium; that is, high frequencies would arrive earlier and lower frequencies would arrive later. Thus, for pulses with wideband frequency content, dispersion hints at a signal's extraterrestrial origin. Astropulse searches for pulses with dispersion measures ranging from 50 pc/cm^{3} to 800 pc/cm^{−3} (chirp rates of 7000 Hz to 400 Hz per microsecond), allowing detection of sources almost anywhere within the Milky Way.

Project proponents believe that Astropulse will either detect exploding black holes, or establish a maximum rate of 5×10^{−14} pc^{−3}yr^{−1}, a factor of 10^{4} better than any previous survey.

=== Challenges ===
Any radio astronomy project confronts issues arising from interference, and the challenges are especially great when the target signals are weak or of transient duration. Military radar noise which is regularly occurring and of known duration can be "blanked" at the radio telescope source. A variety of techniques have been explored in the literature to develop algorithms that detect and account for radar sources that cannot be blanked in this way.

=== Results ===
Astropulse started computing in mid-July 2008. As of January 2009, the results have been used in a variety of ways. Development staff, aided by volunteers, have worked to assure that the client works effectively on a broad array of operating systems. Code has been refined and optimized to reduce calculation time on the local work station. Results have been analyzed so that the algorithms can be adjusted to reduce false positives that may result from interference or from random background noise. To date, a target signal has not yet been found.

== Potential pulse finds ==
One goal of Astropulse is to detect postulated mini black holes that might be evaporating due to "Hawking radiation". Such mini black holes are postulated to have been created during the Big Bang, unlike currently known black holes. The Astropulse project hopes that this evaporation would produce radio waves that Astropulse can detect. The evaporation wouldn't create radio waves directly. Instead, it would create an expanding fireball of high-energy gamma rays and particles. This fireball would interact with the surrounding magnetic field, pushing it out and generating radio waves.

Rotating radio transients (RRATs) are a type of neutron stars discovered in 2006 by a team led by Maura McLaughlin from the Jodrell Bank Observatory at the University of Manchester in the UK. RRATs are believed to produce radio emissions which are very difficult to locate, because of their transient nature. Early efforts have been able to detect radio emissions (sometimes called RRAT flashes) for less than one second a day, and, like with other single-burst signals, one must take great care to distinguish them from terrestrial radio interference. Distributing computing and the Astropulse algorithm may thus lend itself to further detection of RRATs.

Pulses with an apparent extragalactic origin have been observed in archived data. It is suggested that hundreds of similar events could occur every day and, if detected, could serve as cosmological probes. Radio pulsar surveys such as Astropulse-SETI@home offer one of the few opportunities to monitor the radio sky for impulsive burst-like events with millisecond durations. Because of the isolated nature of the observed phenomenon, the nature of the source remains speculative. Possibilities include a black hole-neutron star collision, a neutron star-neutron star collision, a black hole-black hole collision, or some phenomenon not yet considered.

However, in 2010 there was a new report of 16 similar pulses from the Parkes Telescope which were clearly of terrestrial origin.

Previous searches by SETI@home have looked for extraterrestrial communications in the form of narrow-band signals, analogous to our own radio stations. The Astropulse project argues that since we know nothing about how ET might communicate, this might be a bit closed-minded. Thus, the Astropulse survey can be viewed as supplementing the narrow-band SETI@home survey as a by-product of the search for physical phenomena.

RF radiation from outer space was first discovered by Karl G. Jansky (1905–1950), who worked as a radio engineer at the Bell Telephone Laboratories to studying radio frequency interference from thunderstorms for Bell Laboratories. He found "...a steady hiss type static of unknown origin", which eventually he concluded had an extraterrestrial origin. Pulsars (rotating neutron stars) and quasars (dense central cores of extremely distant galaxies) were both discovered by radio astronomers. In 2003 astronomers using the Parkes radio telescope discovered two pulsars orbiting each other, the first such system known. Explaining their recent discovery of a powerful bursting radio source, NRL astronomer Dr. Joseph Lazio stated: "Amazingly, even though the sky is known to be full of transient objects emitting at X- and gamma-ray wavelengths, very little has been done to look for radio bursts, which are often easier for astronomical objects to produce." The use of coherent dedispersion algorithms and the computing power provided by the SETI network may lead to discovery of previously undiscovered phenomena.

== Astronomy in schools ==
Astropulse and its older partner, SETI@home, offer a concrete way for secondary school science teachers to involve their students with astronomy and computing. A number of schools maintain volunteer computing class projects.
