= Help Defeat Cancer =

World Community Grid volunteer computing subproject

The Help Defeat Cancer project ran on World Community Grid from July 20, 2006, to April 2007. It sought to improve the ability of medical professionals to determine the best treatment options for patients with cancers of the breast, head, or neck. The project worked by identifying visual patterns in large numbers of tissue microarrays taken from archived tissue samples. By correlating the pattern data with information about treatment and patient outcome, the results of this project could help provide better targeted treatment options.
