= Olin Library =

Olin Library may refer to:

Libraries named after Franklin W. Olin:

- The library at Olin College of Engineering
- Olin Library at Rollins College
- F. W. Olin Library at Mills College
- Olin Science Library at Colby College

Libraries named after John M. Olin:

- Olin Library at Cornell University Library
- Olin Library at Washington University Libraries

Libraries named after Stephen Olin:

- Olin Library at Wesleyan University
