= Leiden Classical =

BOINC based volunteer computing project

- Leiden Classical graphics
- Operating system: cross-platform
- Platform: BOINC
- Website: boinc.gorlaeus.net

Leiden Classical was a volunteer computing project run by the Theoretical Chemistry Department of the Leiden Institute of Chemistry at Leiden University. Leiden Classical used the BOINC system, and enabled scientists or science students to submit their own test simulations of various molecules and atoms in a classical mechanics environment. ClassicalDynamics is a program (and with it a library) completely written in C++. The library is covered by the LGPL license and the main program is covered by the GPL. The project shut down on June 5, 2018.

== Joining the project ==
Participation was possible via the BOINC manager. Using this software one was once able to create an account in the project. Then someone can make a model of a dynamic system and simulation participating run. There are several models possible, to interactions between molecules or planets.

== User Submitted Calculations ==
To create a personal calculation, a user's model had to have six defined variables:

1. Colors of the molecules
2. Box in which the model is run
3. Number of particles in the simulation
4. Interaction between the particles
  1. Gravity
  2. Coulomb force
  3. Lennard-Jones interaction
  4. Morse interaction
  5. Rydberg interaction
  6. Harmonic spirit
  7. Harmonic bending
  8. Recurrent torsion interactions
5. Distance conditions
6. Confirmation parameter(s)

== See also ==
- List of volunteer computing projects
