= Big and Ugly Rendering Project =

BOINC based volunteer computing project for rendering videos

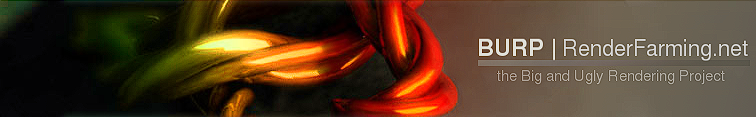

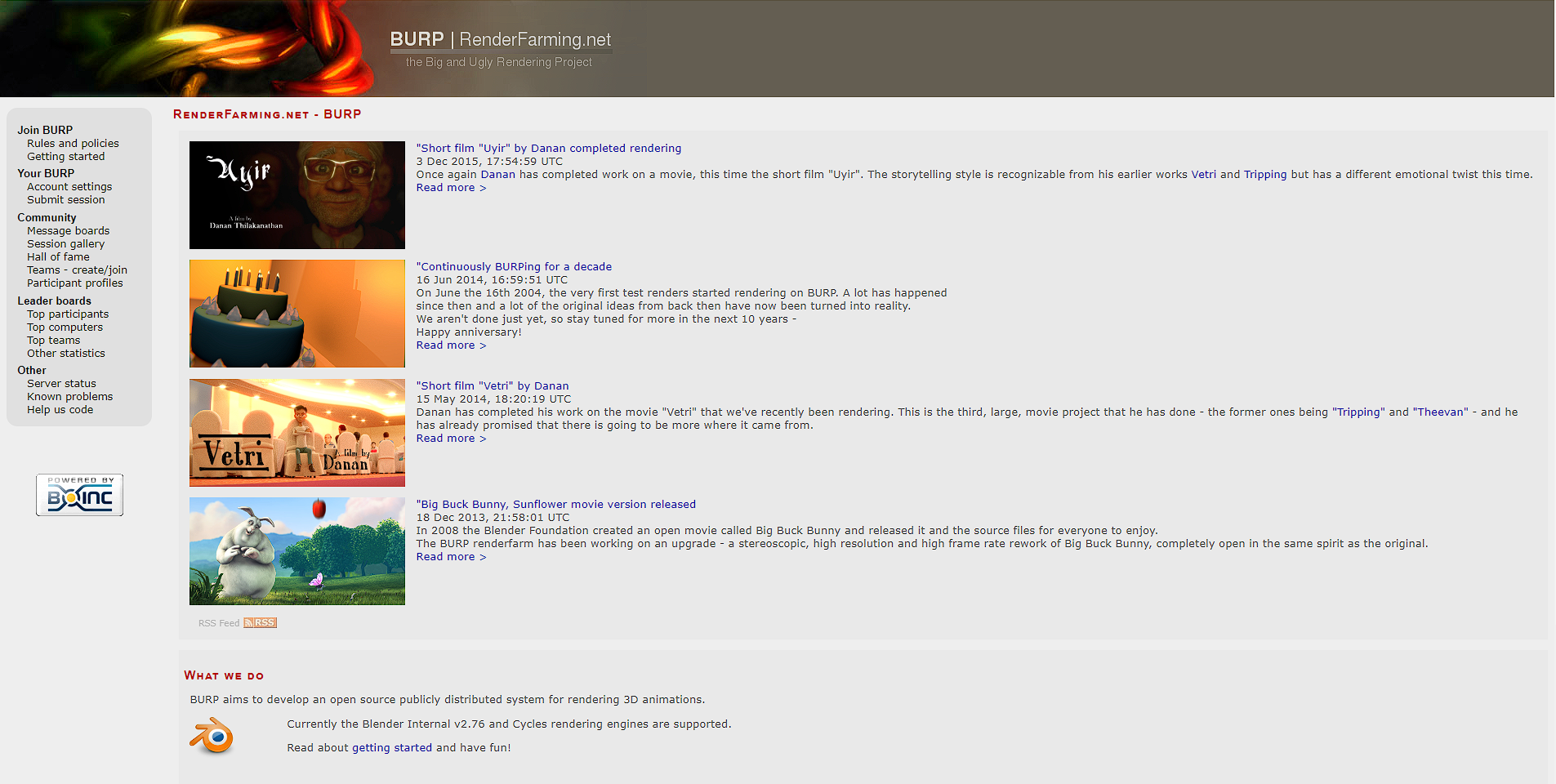
- Platform: BOINC
- Website: burp.renderfarming.net

Big and Ugly Rendering Project (BURP) is a non-commercial volunteer computing project using the BOINC framework for the rendering of 3D graphics that has been in hibernation as of 2020. The project website currently shows the status as "extended maintenance" until 2027.

BURP utilizes the volunteer and grid computing software BOINC, to distribute computing tasks to volunteer computers. BURP is free software distributed under the GNU General Public License V3. Because BURP is used to refer to both the BOINC project and BURP back-end software, some confusion can arise when talking about other services running the BURP software.

== History ==
The main BURP website went online on 17 June 2004. At that time the only supported renderer was YafaRay (Yet Another Free Raytracer). That August it became clear that YafaRay was not the best choice, and focus was shifted towards Blender, a renderer with more features and a compact file format.

By the end of October enough tests had been done to show that not only is the distributed rendering of 3D animations possible, it can achieve performance that rivals many commercial render farms. The current trend of increasing network bandwidth throughout the world will make it even more powerful. The rest of 2004 was used to improve and develop the website frontend for the system.

Until May 2005, the Linux and Windows clients got major code overhauls and loads of tests were done to estimate and improve performance of several aspects of the data transfer systems. Most importantly, code for a mirrored storage and distribution system for the rendered output started to emerge.

In May 2010, the project entered a beta stage, requiring users to agree to a new set of licensing rules based on the Creative Commons.

High-frame-rate versions of the film Big Buck Bunny were rendered and released in 2013.

Although many people have contributed to the source code since the start of the project, the majority of the BURP code base remains authored by Janus Kristensen, who continues as the head developer of the software.

=== Open Rendering Environment (ORE) and Renderfarm.fi ===
In 2007–2009, the Open Rendering Environment (ORE) project run by the Laurea University of Applied Sciences in Finland was created under guidance from Janus Kristensen and Julius Tuomisto, a team consisting mainly of undergraduate students started to do research on BURP for applications in Finnish small and medium-sized enterprises and third level education. For the project, an independent BURP server was set up in Finland and given the domain Renderfarm.fi, a name which the project was identified by until its closure in late 2014.

Upon its opening to a public beta in summer 2009, Renderfarm.fi claimed to be the world's first publicly distributed render farm that advocated the use of Creative Commons licensing. The main BURP project later followed suit and took up a similar licensing scheme.

Although they used similar back-end code, Renderfarm.fi and BURP had some notable differences in the way their front ends worked. For example, Renderfarm.fi used the open source Django web application framework for managing information on its website, whereas BURP relies on a custom solution based on BOINC's content management system.

== BURP architecture ==
The main design idea behind BURP is to use spare CPU cycles on participating computers around the world to render 3D images and animations submitted by the users of the BURP network - in other words to build a large shared render farm that can be freely used by those who also contribute computing power to it.

The fundamental goal of this design is to give users access to computing power to render animations that would take an impossibly long time on a single computer. By dividing the work among hundreds of computers, an animation that takes possibly months to render in CPU time could be completed in only a few days. In tandem with this collaborative approach, BURP hopes to make animations and images public as soon as they are finished so that all participants will be able to see the outcome.

=== Open by design ===
When asked about whether the system encrypts or obfuscates the data it processes, Janus Kristensen stated in an August 2010 AssemblyTV interview: "No. The whole system is based on open ideas. When you send files to people, they can look into the files and see what's inside. Actually that's part of what's cool about a project like this. It's community based and not closed down or DRM protected in any way."

=== Accessibility ===
While the ORE project researched the possibilities of using BURP for education and business, it became evident that accessibility would be key in reaching users. The development focus within the ORE project soon shifted towards making BURP more accessible. A script for uploading work to a BURP project directly from within the Blender software was created to address these issues. The script lets the user input a rendering task (the file to be rendered as well as additional information), called a "session" through an XMLRPC interface on the BURP service. Since the release of Blender 2.5 Beta 3, the script has been available as an add-on in the main trunk of Blender.

=== Supported render software ===
- Blender (software)

== See also ==
- Parallel rendering
