= Gridcoin =

Cryptocurrency rewarding work on BOINC

Denominations
- Plural: Gridcoins
- Code: GRC
- Precision: 10^{−8}
- Subunits
- 1/100000000: halford

Development
- Original author: Rob Halförd
- White paper: Gridcoin: The Computation Power of a Blockchain Driving Science & Data Analysis
- Implementation: Gridcoin-Research
- Latest release: 5.4.9.0-leisure / February 16, 2025; 12 months ago
- Code repository: github.com/gridcoin-community/Gridcoin-Research
- Development status: Active
- Project fork of: Bitcoin, Peercoin
- Written in: C++
- Operating system: Windows, Linux, macOS
- Developer: Gridcoin Community
- Source model: Open source
- License: MIT License

Ledger
- Timestamping scheme: Proof-of-stake

Valuation
- Exchange rate: Floating

Website
- Website: gridcoin.us

Gridcoin (abbreviation: GRC) is a cryptocurrency which rewards volunteer computing performed on the BOINC platform. BOINC was originally developed to support SETI@home, but has also been used for research in other areas.

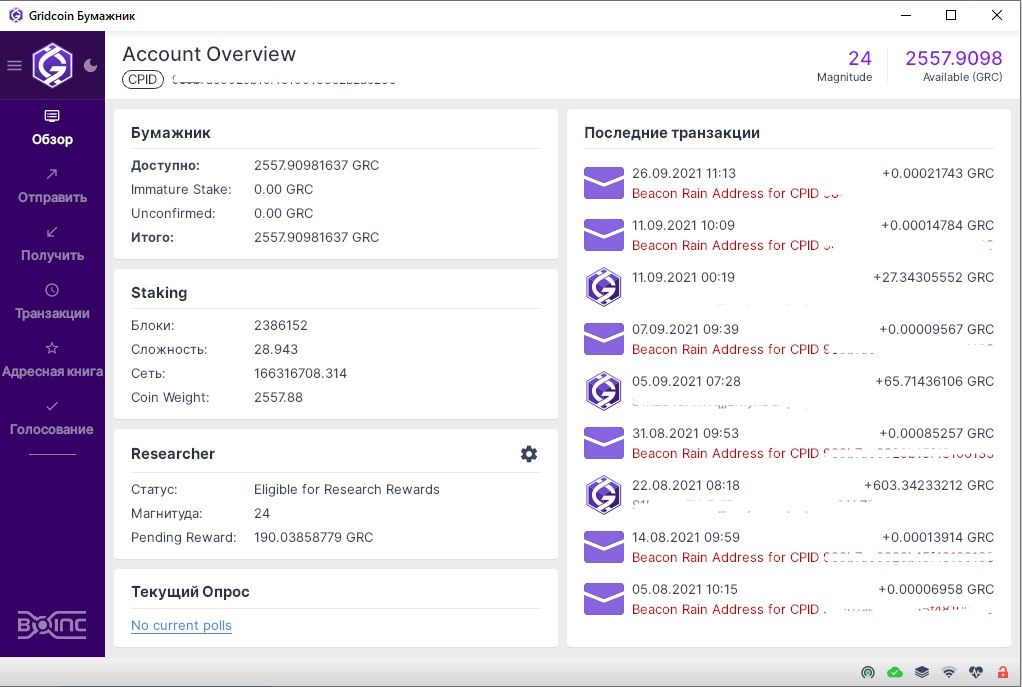
Version 5.3.2.0 of the Gridcoin wallet

Gridcoin was created on October 16, 2013, by Rob Halförd. Initially using the energy-intensive proof of work, as used by Bitcoin, Gridcoin migrated to a proof of stake protocol in 2014, similar to Peercoin, in an attempt to address the environmental impact of cryptocurrency mining.

An exploit was demonstrated in August 2017 that revealed the email addresses of Gridcoin users and allowed the theft of other users' work. The research team had disclosed the vulnerability to the developers in September 2016, and a patch was released in March 2017 with version 3.5.8.7. However the implementation of the fix introduced other issues.

The implementation Gridcoin-Research was created as a fork of Bitcoin and Peercoin and is licensed under the MIT License. It uses Qt 5 for its user interface and prebuilt executables of the wallet are distributed for Windows, macOS, and Debian.
