= Refeudalization =

Process of re-establishing the political structure of feudalism

In political theory, refeudalization is the process of recovering the political mechanisms and relationships that used to define feudalism. Because the term "feudalism" is slightly ambiguous, "refeudalization" is ambiguous, too.

In the modern era, the term "refeudalization" is used for policies that give special privileges to organized groups.

== Refeudalization in 17th-century European historiography ==
The process of refeudalization is also used in seventeenth-century European historiography. The term was made famous by Italian Marxist historians Ruggiero Romano and Rosario Villari, to illuminate the social conditions behind the Neapolitan Revolt of 1647. The concept was influenced by Gramsci's ideas, the historiographical debates during the 1950s and 1960s that centered on Eric Hobsbawm's seventeenth century "General Crisis" as well as 1960s Italian politics. Villari used it quite specifically in reference to the increasing pressure in the six decades preceding the revolt of 1647, in which the peasantry and the lower-middle classes revolted against the feudal aristocracy and international financiers. The process was triggered by the royal state's need for money. The Spanish crown ennobled the bourgeoisie of rich merchants and financiers, who infiltrated and reinforced the noble order. Fernand Braudel found the “clearest case of refeudalization” in Spanish Naples. The monarchy had raised capital by selling feudal titles, which in the long term increased the fiscal burden that the seigneurial regime imposed on the rural poor, since the nobles were exempted from paying taxes to the viceroyal regime. Refeudalization in a more general sense has been used to explain Italy's failed transition to modern capitalism. Though Italy had pioneered the commercial revolution, feudal barons neglected business opportunities to innovate and further rationalize the processes of production.

== Refeudalization in Jürgen Habermas's theory of the public sphere ==
Jürgen Habermas’s theory of the public sphere is based on his research into the bourgeois class of the eighteenth century in Great Britain, France and Germany; his key work on the theme is The Structural Transformation of the Public Sphere (1962). Habermas saw space that had been gained for the public around the eighteenth and nineteenth centuries returning to private hands, a process which he called 'the refeudalization [Refeudalisierung] of the public sphere': 'Habermas discussed the pincer-like movement in which late modern consumer capitalism attempts to turn us into unthinking mass consumers on one hand, while political actors, interest groups, and the state try to turn us into unthinking mass citizens on the other'.

=== Habermas's idea of the public sphere ===
For Habermas, the 'public sphere' is 'a space in which all citizens can critically, substantively, and rationally debate public policy' (though this does not necessarily exist in any single physical space: it can also be constituted, for example, by newspapers). In its ideal form, the public sphere is "made up of private people gathered together as a public and articulating the needs of society with the state". The public sphere is the source of public opinion needed to "legitimate authority in functioning democracy". Habermas made a distinction between lifeworld and system. The public sphere is part of the lifeworld and it is the immediate setting of the individual social actor, and Habermas opposed any analysis which uncoupled the interdependence of the lifeworld.

Habermas's analysis is based on an oral bias; he believed that the public sphere can be most effectively constituted and maintained through dialogue, acts of speech, debate and discussion. In his further reflections, Habermas claims that public debate can be animated by “opinion-forming associations” which are voluntary associations, social organizations such as from churches, sports clubs, groups of concerned citizens, grassroots movements, trade unions – to counter or refashion the messages of authority. This public sphere began to form first in Britain at the end of the seventeenth century. It resulted in the Licensing Act (1695), which allowed newspapers to print what they want without the Queen’s censorship. However, there were still strict laws. But the sphere is seen as a crucial enabler for this to happen.

=== Refeudalization of the public sphere ===
For Habermas, a key feature of the feudal is that small numbers of individuals embodied the public state: a king or similar officer was the realm (what Habermas called 'representative publicity'). Habermas saw the eighteenth-century bourgeois public sphere as a positive contrast to this situation. But in the twentieth century, he perceived the rise of advertising, marketing and 'public relations' trying to manipulate the public and discourage critical thought, and he perceived the state, political parties, and interest groups increasingly using the same approaches to win votes. This is 'refeudalization' because 'the public sphere becomes the court ''before'' whose public prestige can be displayed─rather than ''in'' which public critical debate is carried on'.

"Publicity once meant the exposure of political domination before public reasoning; publicity [here Habermas uses the English word] sums up the reactions of a non-binding goodwill. The bourgeois public sphere readopts feudal qualities in proportion to its formation by public relations [in English]: the "offering agents" display representative expenditure in front of compliant customers. Publicity imitates that aura of personal prestige and preternatural authority which the representative public sphere had once imparted.

A "refeudalization" of the public sphere must be discussed in another, more exact sense. The integration of mass entertainment and advertising, which in the form of public relations already assumes a "political" character, subjugates namely even the state under its code. Because private companies suggest to their customers in consumer decisions the consciousness of citizens, the state has to "appeal to" its citizens like consumers. Thus the public use of violence also solicits publicity.

Some recent commentators have argued that the politics of twenty-first century America, and the West more generally, take further the trends observed by Habermas.

== Refeudalization in sociology of neoliberal globalization ==
There is a third context which sociologists, drawing on Habermas, refer to contemporary socio-economic processes in the global economy as refeudalization. The concepts overlap with discussions of neomedievalism. The Swiss sociologist Jean Ziegler uses the German expression "Refeudalisierung der Gesellschaft" to illuminate the forces behind neoliberal globalization. In his pamphlet "The Empire of Shame", he criticizes the new system of "Refeudalisierung" based on scarcity and debt. However, the concept in English is typically translated as the "new feudalization", which here means the subversion of Enlightenment values (freedom, equality and brotherhood) and the radical privatization of public goods and services. Comparable ideas have been developed by Sighard Neckel. The historian and Director of CALAS Olaf Kaltmeier extended this approach to include political-cultural dimensions and applied it to Latin America. In doing so, he combines the extreme social polarization of the social structure with the unequal distribution of land in Latin America, spatial segregation in the form of gated communities and shopping centres (often accompanied by retro-colonial architecture), an extractivist economy with accumulation by dispossession, and a duplication of economic power through political power in the form of millionaires who, like Mauricio Macri or Sebastián Pineira, become presidents.

== See also ==
- Neo-feudalism
- Neo-colonialism
