= Robin Weiss =

British molecular biologist (1940–2026)

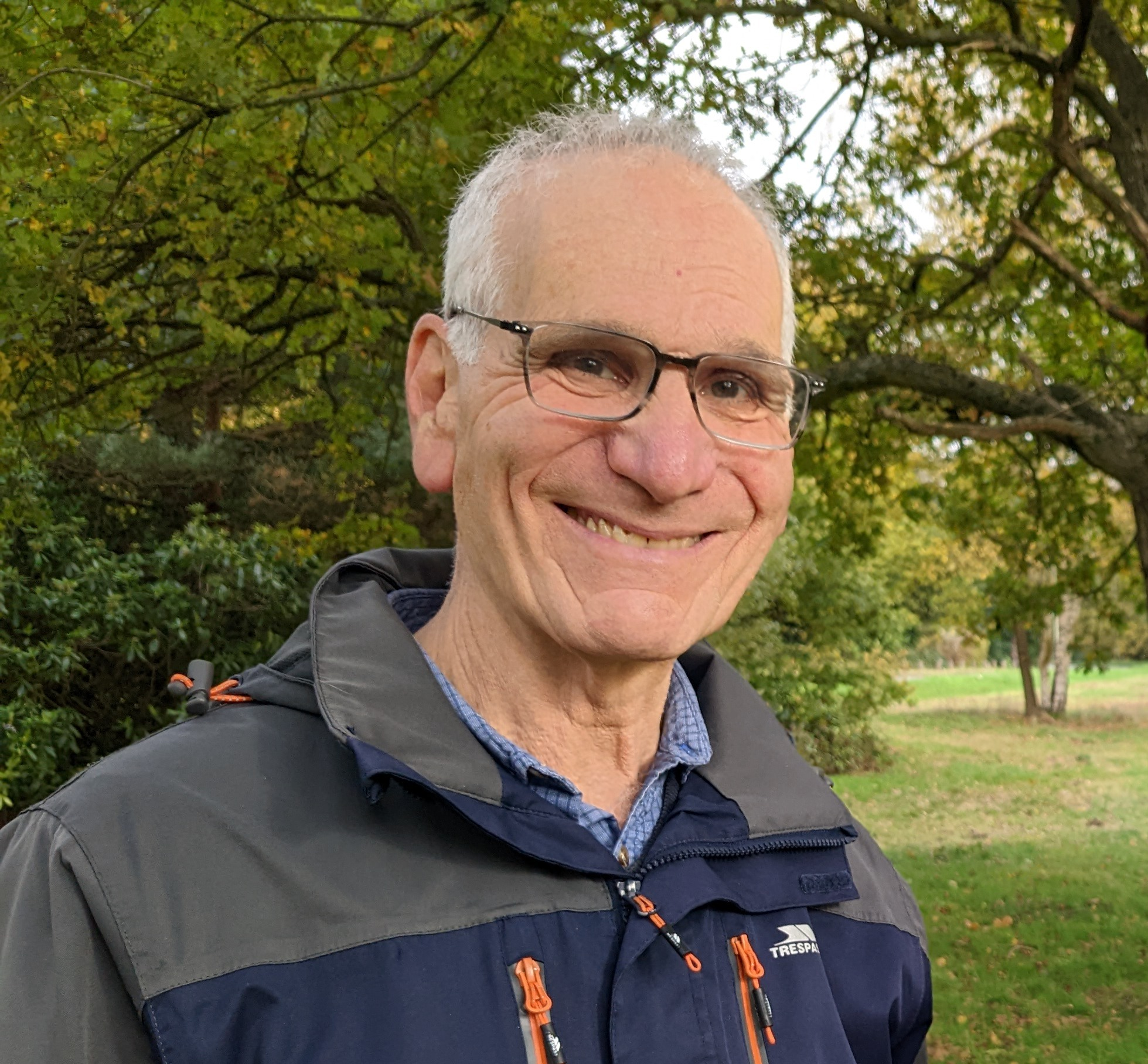
- Born: 20 February 1940; London, England
- Died: 27 February 2026 (aged 86)
- Employer: University College London
- Known for: Scientific discoveries related to HIV retrovirus
- Title: Emeritus Professor of Viral Oncology; Fellow of the Royal Society
- Children: Helen Weiss, Rachel Weiss (businesswoman)
- Awards: MW Beijerinck Prize for Virology; Ernst Chain Prize

Robert Anthony "Robin" Weiss (20 February 1940 – 27 February 2026) was a British molecular biologist, and an influential scientist in virology and cancer biology. His research was focused on retroviruses and he was noted for important discoveries related to HIV. He was a Fellow of the Royal Society and an Honorary Fellow of the Royal College of Physicians. In 2001, he was awarded the M. W. Beijerinck Prize for Virology for his work on retroviruses. In 2007, he was awarded the Ernst Chain Prize for pioneering "our understanding of HIV and AIDS". He was Emeritus Professor of Viral Oncology at University College London and a member of the Nuffield Council on Bioethics. He was also editor-in-chief of the British Journal of Cancer until 2005.

== Early life and education ==
Weiss was born in London, England on 20 February 1940. He identified as ethnically Jewish and agnostic. His parents were Hans Weiss, a businessman, and his wife Stefanie Löwinsohn, secular German-Jewish refugees who had arrived in the UK in 1935.

Weiss was educated at Abbotsholme School, Staffordshire and read Zoology at University College London (UCL). He remained at UCL for his PhD under the supervision of Michael Abercrombie FRS.

== Career ==
Weiss worked at the Imperial Cancer Research Fund (now Cancer Research UK), researching leukaemia and sarcoma viruses. He became director at The Institute of Cancer Research (ICR), London in 1980 until 1989, after which he continued as director of research for a further nine years. While at ICR, Weiss "made discoveries that reshaped our understanding of retroviruses, HIV and virus-associated cancers".

In 1999, he was appointed Professor of Viral Oncology at University College London. Until 2005, Weiss was editor-in-chief of the British Journal of Cancer. His successor, A. L. Harris, states that Weiss showed "clear vision in developing the British Journal of Cancer into [a] multidisciplinary journal with a focus on research that aims to deliver benefits to cancer patients".

== Research ==
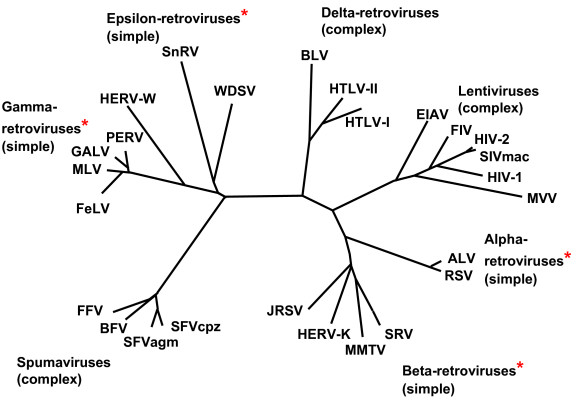
Diagram of the Phylogeny of Retroviruses. Robin A Weiss (2006). CC-BY-3.0 Unported.

Weiss's research was focused on retroviruses, initially as a means of understanding T-cell leukemia and other cancers, which may be caused by retroviruses. A break-through discovery in 1971 was that the retroviral genome in chickens follows the rules of Mendelian inheritance.

Later his work moved on to HIV, also a retrovirus, and made several new important discoveries, most notably identifying CD4 on lymphocytes as the binding receptor for HIV. Weiss collaborated on research with the Gates Foundation on the development of a HIV vaccine. He contributed to the development of an assay for HIV antibodies which enabled diagnostic tests and screening for blood donors. He also investigated viral threats such SARS and the role of viruses in xenotransplantation.

== Personal life and death ==
Weiss was married in 1964 to Margaret D'Costa, originally from Singapore. They had two daughters, Helen and Rachel. Helen Weiss is an epidemiologist and Rachel Weiss is the founder of the Menopause Café movement.

Weiss died from cancer on 27 February 2026, at the age of 86.

== Awards and recognition ==
In 1977, Weiss was elected a member of the European Molecular Biology Organization. He was elected a Fellow of the Royal Society in 1997 and Fellow of the Academy of Medical Sciences in 1998. In 1999, he became an Honorary Fellow of the Royal College of Physicians.

In November 2001, the Royal Netherlands Academy of Arts and Sciences awarded Weiss the M. W. Beijerinck Prize for Virology, noting especially his work on retroviruses. In the same year, he delivered the Leeuwenhoek Lecture.

In 2007, Imperial College London awarded Weiss the Ernst Chain Prize, noting that he "has pioneered our understanding of HIV and AIDS, particularly on the identification of CD4 as the HIV receptor and on the analysis of neutralizing antibodies to the virus".

Weiss was elected as Honorary Member of the Microbiology Society in 2009. He was a member of the European Academy of Microbiology (EAM). He was elected to the American Philosophical Society in 2018.

== Publications ==
Weiss, RA (2015). 70th Anniversary Collection of the Microbiology Society: Journal of General Virology. Journal of General Virology. Volume 96, Issue 12.

Weiss, RA (2015). What's the host and what's the microbe? The Marjory Stephenson Prize Lecture 2015. Journal of General Virology. Volume 96, Issue 9.

Koh, WWL; Forsman, A; Hué, S; van der Velden, GJ; Yirrell, DL; McKnight, Á; Weiss, RA; Aasa-Chapman, MMI (2010). Novel subtype C human immunodeficiency virus type 1 envelopes cloned directly from plasma: coreceptor usage and neutralization phenotypes. Journal of General Virology. Volume 91, Issue 9.

Wright, E; Temperton, NJ; Marston, DA; McElhinney, LM; Fooks, AR; Weiss, RA (2008). Investigating antibody neutralization of lyssaviruses using lentiviral pseudotypes: a cross-species comparison. Journal of General Virology. Volume 89, Issue 9.

Bartosch, B; Weiss, RA; Takeuchi, Y (2002). PCR-based cloning and immunocytological titration of infectious porcine endogenous retrovirus subgroup A and B. Journal of General Virology. Volume 83, Issue 9.

Schulz, TF; Hoad, JG; Whitby, D; Tizard, EJ; Dillon, MJ; Weiss, RA (1992). A measles virus isolate from a child with Kawasaki disease: sequence comparison with contemporaneous isolates from ‘classical’ cases. Journal of General Virology. Volume 73, Issue 6.

McClure, MO; Sommerfelt, MA; Marsh, M; Weiss, RA (1990). The pH independence of mammalian retrovirus infection. Journal of General Virology. Volume 71, Issue 4.
