= Rachel Weiss (businesswoman) =

British counsellor, teacher and social entrepreneur

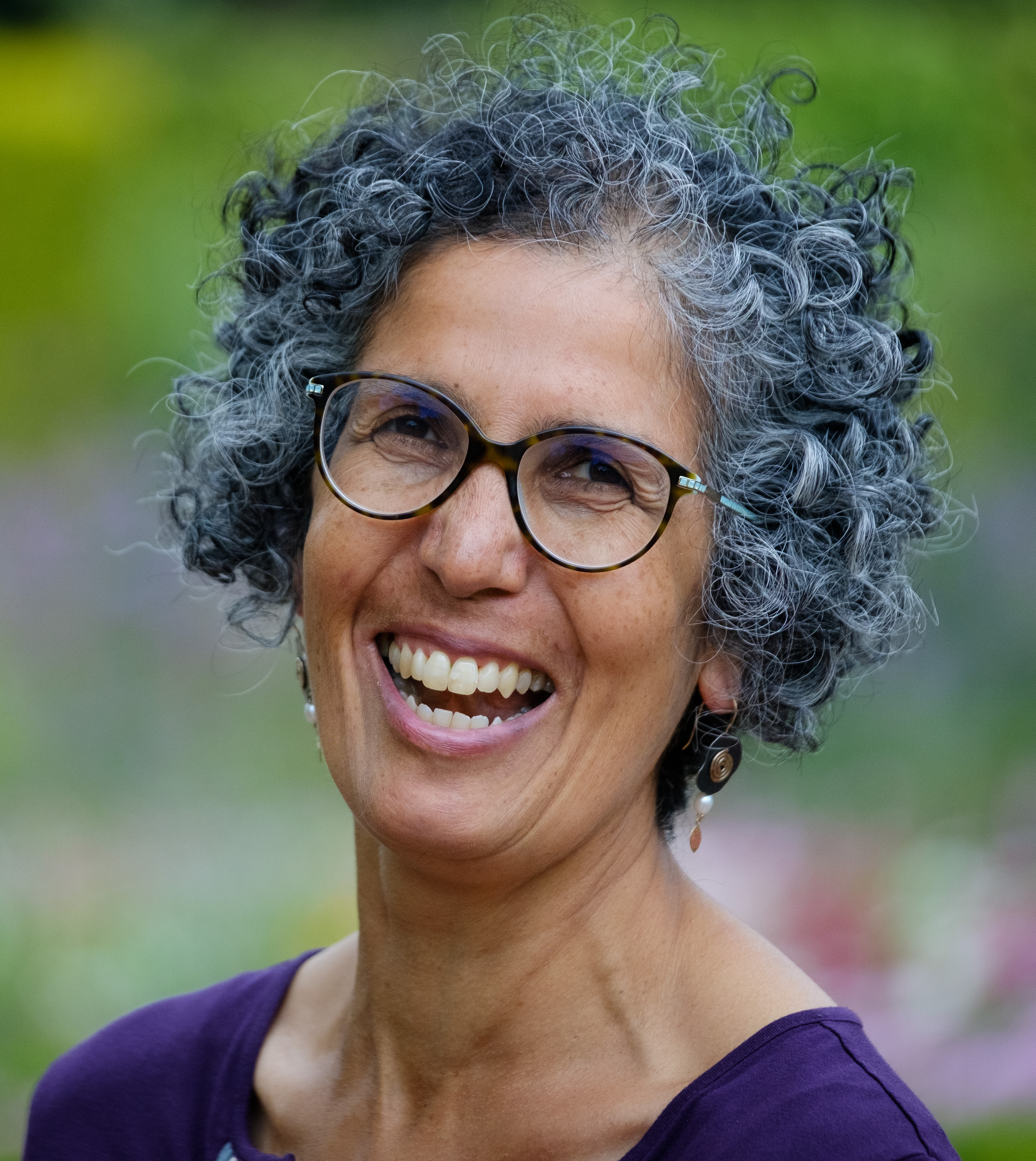
- Weiss in 2021
- Born: 1966 (age 59–60); London
- Education: University of Edinburgh
- Occupations: Social entrepreneur, counsellor
- Known for: Founder of Menopause Café movement
- Relatives: Robin Weiss (father) Helen Weiss (sister)
- Website: Official website

Rachel Weiss (born 1966) is a British counsellor, teacher and social entrepreneur based in Perth, Scotland, who set up the Menopause Café model which has become a global movement. Starting from the first café in Perth in 2017, there are now cafés across the world that promote conversation about menopause. She has received the Prime Minister’s Point of Light Award 2018 and the Association of Scottish Businesswomen (ASB) Lifetime Achievement Award 2024.

== Early life and education ==
Weiss was born in London in 1966. Her virologist father Robin Weiss was born in London to German Jewish refugees. Her mother, a maths teacher, had moved to the UK from Singapore in the 1960s.

Weiss won a scholarship to work as a computer programmer, at what is now Plymouth Marjon University, before attending the University of Oxford to study Mathematics. Weiss moved to the University of Edinburgh for her postgraduate study in artificial intelligence, obtaining a MSc in 1990. She then undertook teaching training in Northern College, Aberdeen (now part of the University of Aberdeen).

She met her husband Andy in Edinburgh and moved to Perth in 1997. They have three children.

== Career ==
=== Charitable work and volunteering ===
While at Oxford, Weiss formed the Homeless Action Group society, organising a rota for students to volunteer in homeless shelters. After graduation, she volunteered with a charity supporting refugees in Berlin, teaching Maths and English to Lebanese refugees.

=== Teaching and counselling ===
After teacher training in Aberdeen, Weiss worked as a maths teacher and a tutor at the Open University. She undertook a counselling course, as she felt this would make her a better teacher, but it influenced another career change. In 1997, Weiss and Christine Partridge founded Rowan Consultancy, an organisation providing counselling and workplace support services..

=== Menopause Café charity ===
At the age of 50, Weiss saw a TV documentary about menopause presented by Kirsty Wark, The Menopause and Me. She was inspired to create the first Menopause Café using the format of the Death Café, which she had previously hosted in Perth.

The first café was in June 2017, held in Blend Coffee Lounge, Perth with nearly 30 people in attendance. In its first year, more than 38 café events were held in Scotland, England and Canada. It became a registered charity in 2018 and Kirsty Wark became their Patron. People Magazine called it a "global movement" in 2023. Weiss set up the annual Menopause Festival, called Flushfest, in 2018.

Labour MSP Monica Lennon contacted Weiss in 2022 to discuss menopause in the workplace stating "Governments need to think about what a good, modern workplace looks like, where it is not taboo to talk about menstruation and menopause leave."

== What is a menopause café? ==
A Menopause Café is a pop-up, not-for-profit discussion group, usually in a local café or workplace, with volunteers facilitating, where everyone either new or returning, talks about menopause over a cuppa and cake. The ethos of the events is to provide a confidential space, where people can learn, share ideas, experiences and information around living with menopause regardless of age or gender.

== Awards and recognition ==
- 2018 – UK Points of Light Award, Prime Minister’s Office
- 2024 – Lifetime Achievement Award, Association of Scottish Businesswomen (ASB)

== Publications ==
- Menopause and social media: Pros and cons for the general public. Weiss, Rachel. Maturitas, Volume 174, 67 – 68. August 2023.
- Menopause: empowering women - Menopause: a patient perspective. Weiss, Rachel. Maturitas, Volume 173, 70. July 2023.
- The essential menopause curriculum for healthcare professionals: A European Menopause and Andropause Society (EMAS) position statement, Rees, Margaret et al. Maturitas, Volume 158, 70 - 77. April 2022.
- Global consensus recommendations on menopause in the workplace: A European Menopause and Andropause Society (EMAS) position statement. Rees, Margaret et al. Maturitas, Volume 151, 55 - 62. September 2021.
- Menopause Cafés: It’s good to talk. Weiss, Rachel. Maturitas, Volume 132, 79 - 80. February 2020.

== Other work/contributions ==
In 2019, Weiss chaired a debate about Brexit between two Perthshire MPs, Pete Wishart and Luke Graham.
