= Riadh Sidaoui =

Tunisian writer and political scientist (born 1967)

Riadh Sidaoui رياض الصيداوي
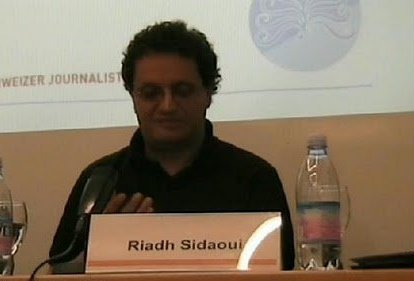
- Riadh Sidaoui in 2007
- Born: 14 May 1967 (age 59); Bou Hajla, Tunisia
- Education: Institute of Press and Information Sciences of Tunis; Faculty of Humanities and Social Sciences of Tìunis; Graduate Institute of Development Studies; University of Geneva
- Scientific career
- Fields: journalism, sociology, political science
- Workplaces: Swiss Broadcasting Corporation, University of Geneva

Riadh Sidaoui (رياض الصيداوي) (born 14 May 1967) is a Swiss–Tunisian writer, journalist and political scientist.

He is the director of the Geneva-based Arab Centre for Political and Social Research and Analysis, and the editor-in-chief of the news website Taqadoumiya since 2010. He published articles in London-based newspapers such as Al-Hayat and Al-Quds Al-Arabi. He regularly appears on international television news channels such as France 24, RT, BBC and Voice of America, as well as on radio stations such as Radio Television Suisse, Deutsche Welle and Monte Carlo Doualiya.

As a specialist in the Arab world, particularly in Algeria, Islamist movements, and the democratization process in the region, Sidaoui is an advocate for democratization in the Arab world and the emancipation of Muslim women. He is opposed to Saudi Wahhabism and its excesses, which he sees as a collection of reactionary dogmas that hinder any intellectual reflection. Sidaoui believes that the political foundations of Islam lie in the democratic republican spirit, rather than the Wahhabi monarchic spirit. For him, Saudi Wahhabism is a danger that threatens Islam, Muslims, and humanity as a whole.

Sidaoui interprets Russia's invasion of Ukraine in 2022 as the dawn of a new World Order. This action is viewed as a sequel to Russia's involvement in Syria, where russians previously maintained a passive stance during Western-led regime changes, such as those in Iraq and Libya Sidaoui suggests that this shift began with the Arab Spring of 2011, amidst a complex geopolitical landscape characterized by a "cold war" between established and emerging economic powers

== Education ==
After completing high-school education in Bouhajla, he obtained a master's degree in journalism (political specialization) from the Institute of Press and Information Sciences of Tunis in 1992, and a DEA (diplôme d'études approfondies) in 1995 from the Faculty of Humanities and Social Sciences of Tunis.

He moved to Switzerland in 1995, where he earned a Master of Advanced Studies in development studies from the Graduate Institute of Development Studies in 1997, and a Master of Advanced Studies in political sciences from the Faculty of Economics and Social Sciences of the University of Geneva in 1998.

== Journalistic career ==
During his journalistic career Sidaoui received several journalistic and academic interviews with personalities such as the Algerian Minister Ahmed Taleb Ibrahimi, but also the first Algerian President Ahmed Ben Bella, with whom he maintained friendly relations, Mohammed Fawzi, Ahmed Hamrouche, Moncef Marzouki or his professor at the University of Geneva, who became his personal friend, Jean Ziegler, with whom he travelled to the Alps.

In the summer of 1992 Sidaoui spent several days in Cairo with Sami Sharaf, one of the founders of the General Intelligence Directorate. Thanks to his help, Sidaoui was able to complete work on his book Heikal or the Secret Acts of Arab Memory. Sharaf had not given interviews before Sidaoui for about ten years.

In 1998, Sidaoui travelled to Algeria to work on behalf of SRG SSR and received interviews with several Algerian politicians such as Abdallah Djaballah, Louisa Hanoune and Chérif El Hachemi.

== Thought ==
=== Islamists ===
Sidaoui draws attention to the notion that many fanatical Islamists have degrees in sciences; in fact, the September 11, 2001 attacks were committed by men who had completed studies in natural sciences. He explains: "Despite the lack of a comprehensive study on the occupational origin of the leadership of Islamist movements in the Arab world, we can see an almost total domination of scientific careers. It seems that the number of engineers, doctors, physicists, etc., acting on behalf of Islam, is considerable. This thesis is confirmed by the success of Islamists in the elections of scientific advice in the faculties of sciences. This same success is difficult if not impossible in the faculties of Humanities and Social Sciences.".

After the fall of Arab dictators in the Arab Spring, Sidaoui said that the first winners of the revolutions are Islamists in view of their capacity of mobilization and organization. In addition, he noted that the Islamists have the overwhelming support of the Arab countries in the Persian Gulf, the petrodollars, but also the United States, that accept a moderate Islam in the Arab world (as in Turkey).

=== Saudi Wahhabism ===
According to Riadh Sidaoui, habitual use of the term Wahhabism is scientifically false, and it should be substituted with the concept of Saudi Wahhabism, an Islamic doctrine which is based on the historical alliance between the political and financial power represented by Ibn Saud and the religious authority represented by Abdul Al-Wahhab. The doctrine continues to exist to this day thanks to this alliance, the financing of several religious channels, and the formation of several sheikhs.

Sidaoui thinks that the political foundations of Islam lie in the republican democratic and non-Wahhabi monarchy mind. For him Saudi Wahhabism is a threat to Islam, Muslims and all humanity.

=== Activities ===
Denouncing the Qatari authorities and politics, which he describes as an absolute dictatorship in total disconnection with democracy, he chairs the International Committee for the Liberation of the Qatari Poet Mohammed Ibn al-Dheeb al-Ajami, attached to the United Nations Human Rights Council.

In 2013 the former wife of Saudi Arabia's King Abdullah bin Abdulaziz Al Saud, Princess Alanoud D. Alfayez, commissioned lawyer and former French Foreign Minister Roland Dumas and jurist Max Coupé to handle the "case of the four princesses"; the princess also asked Sidaoui to be her personal representative. Indeed, it has been nearly twelve years since the daughters of Alanoud, princesses of Saudi Arabia, have been placed under house arrest.

== Publications ==
=== In Arabic ===
- Nasserist Dialogues (حوارات ناصرية) ed. Arabesques, Tunis, 1992 (reissued by the Arab Center for Research and Analysis, Beirut, 2003). ISBN 9973-763-00-9;
- Heikal or the Secret File of Arab Memory (هيكل أو الملف السري للذاكرة العربية), Tunis, 1993 (reissued in Cairo, 2000 and Beirut, 2003). ISBN 9973-17-315-5;
- Conflicts of Political and Military Elites in Algeria: The Party, the Army, the State (صراعات النخب السياسية والعسكرية في الجزائر: الحزب،) (الجيش، الدولة, ed. Arab Institute for Research and Publishing, Beirut, 2000;
- Jean Ziegler Speaks to the Arabs (جان زجلر يتحدث إلى العرب), ed. Arab Center for Research and Analysis, Beirut, 2003;
- The Battles of Abdel Nasser (معارك عبد الناصر), ed. Arab Center for Research and Analysis, Beirut, 2003;
- From Tunis to... Damascus: Hidden Realities of the Arab Spring (من تونس إلى … دمشق: حقائق خفية عن الربيع العربي), ed. Caraps, Tunis, 2015;
- The Autumn of Arab Blood: The Secrets of Daesh and Its Sisters (خريف الدم العربي، أسرار داعش و أخواتها), ed. Caraps, Tunis, 2015;
- End of the Bouteflika Era: Conflicts Among Algeria’s Political and Military Elites (نهاية زمن بوتفليقة، صراعات النخب السياسية والعسكرية في الجزائر), ed. Caraps, Tunis, 2019 (reissued by Bahaeddine Editions and Distributions, Algiers, 2020). ISBN 978-9931-322-33-7.

=== In French ===
- Islamism in Algeria: A Revolution in Progress? (L'islamisme en Algérie: une révolution en marche ?), ed. Université de Genève, Geneva, 1998;
- The Algerian Army 1954/1994: Internal Transformations (L'Armée algérienne 1954-1994: mutations internes), ed. Graduate Institute of Development Studies, Geneva, 1996;
- FIS, Army, GIA: Victors and Vanquished (FIS, armée, GIA : vainqueurs et vaincus), ed. Publisud, Paris, 2002;
- From the Arab Spring to Daesh (Du printemps arabe à Daech), ed. Apollonia, Tunis, 2017. ISBN 978-9973-827-88-3.

=== In English ===
- "The Inner Weakness of Arab Media". caraps.net., in Natascha Fioretti et Marcello Foa, Islam and the Western World: the Role of the Media, ed. European Journalism Observatory, Lugano, 2008 ;
- « Islamic Politics and the Military: Algeria 1962-2008 », in Jan-Erik Lane et Hamadi Redissi, Religion and Politics: Islam and Muslim Civilisation, ed. Ashgate Publishing, Farnham, 2009, pp.225-247 ISBN 0-7546-7418-5.
