= Africa@home =

Volunteer computing project

Africa@home is a website that allow users to use their home computers to contribute for humanitarian causes at Africa. This project first went public on 13 July 2006. It partners with Swiss Tropical Institute, the University of Geneva, CERN, and ICVolunteers (ICV). It is sponsored by the Geneva International Academic Network (GIAN).

Africa@home together with ICVolunteers, recruited volunteers across Africa to help with the project. The Malaria Control Project (MCP) was the first and the only volunteer computing project run by Africa@home. MCP ran for 10 years and became inactive since 21 June 2016.

== See also ==
- Malaria Control Project
- List of volunteer computing projects
- Berkeley Open Infrastructure for Network Computing (BOINC)
- Volunteer computing
- Grid computing
- Geneva International Academic Network
