= Graduate Institute of Development Studies =

School in Geneva, Switzerland

- Institut universitaire d’études du développement
- Former names: Institut Africain de Genève (African Institute of Geneva)
- Type: Public graduate school
- Active: 1961–2007
- Affiliations: University of Geneva
- Location: Geneva, Switzerland
- Campus: Urban
- Working languages: English; French
- Nickname: IUED

The Graduate Institute of Development Studies (French: Institut universitaire d’études du développement, IUED) was a graduate school in Geneva, Switzerland focusing on development studies. Founded in 1977, it was recognized by the Swiss Federal Council as a university institution in its own right at the end of 2002.

The IUED ceases its activities in 2008 following the creation of the new Graduate Institute of International and Development Studies (IHEID), the result of the merger with the Graduate Institute of International Studies (IUHEI) and the IUED.

== History ==
Created in 1961 as the Institut Africain de Genève (African Institute of Geneva), its stated goal was to promote teaching and research concerning international development and to encourage students from the Global South.

The Geneva center for the training of African executives was created by the Canton of Geneva with the contribution of Jacques Freymond in 1961, with the aim of offering African executives a reception center and creating a place for reflection and research for people interested in development issues.

This center became the African Institute of Geneva the following year and then took the name Graduate Institute of Development Studies (Institut universitaire d’études du développement, IUED) in 1973. The IUED was born from the signing of an agreement with the University of Geneva in 1977. Since that time, the institute has gradually opened up to students from all over the world.

The IUED trained several generations of development activists in Switzerland and in the world (including at PhD level after 1995) and was at the center of a huge international network. Very active in concrete development projects, the IUED was also known in the francophone world for proposing an alternative and a critical view of development aid and world affairs, as well as for its journal, Cahiers de l'IUED. It was also among the pioneer institutions in Europe for the intellectual development of the sustainable development perspective. Among its directors were Roy Preiswerk, Pierre Bungener, Jacques Forster (actual head of IHEID Foundation Board), Jean-Luc Maurer and Michel Carton. GIDS was attached to, but independent of, the University of Geneva.

== Merger ==
In 1999, it joined forces with the Graduate Institute of International Studies (IUHEI) to create the International University Network of Geneva (RUIG) with the aim of promoting the exchange of ideas and joint projects of Swiss and international institutions and organizations. non-governmental organizations working in the field of international relations. The collaboration with the Graduate Institute of International Studies continued in 2005 with the proposal of a program of seminars common to the two institutes within the framework of the Bologna Convention.

In 2006, a merger agreement was signed between the two institutions, which came together within the Graduate Institute of International and Development Studies on January 1, 2008. In 2008, IUED and the Graduate Institute of International Studies (IUHEI) were combined into a new institution, the Graduate Institute of International and Development Studies (IHEID). The new Institute combines the fields of development studies and international relations and offers a much wider choice of teaching and research activities.

== Notable alumni ==
- Jean-Victor Harvel Jean-Baptiste, minister of foreign and religious affairs of Haiti
- Juan Gasparini, Argentinian journalist and writer
- Antonio Hodgers, conseiller national, Berne.
- Alpha Oumar Konaré, ex-president of Mali.
- Carlos Lopes, Executive Director of the United Nations Institute for Training and Research and Assistant-Secretary General to the United Nations
- Duarte Pio, Portuguese Duke of Braganza and claimant to the throne of Portugal
- Riadh Sidaoui, writer and political scientist.
- Marcelo Zabalaga, ex-president of the Central Bank of Bolivia

== Notable faculty ==
- Cruz Melchor Eya Nchama
- Gilbert Rist
- Jean Ziegler, Swiss sociologist
- Yvonne Preiswerk
- Jacques Grinevald
- Alessandro Monsutti
- Philippe Regnier
- Pape Diouf
- Gilles Carbonnier
