= Menopause Café =

Social meetup concept with a topic of menopause

A Menopause Café is a scheduled, non-profit get-together for the purpose of talking about menopause over tea and cake. The first Menopause Café was held in Perth, Scotland and was the idea of Rachel Weiss, a counsellor and social entrepreneur. They have since been held in many countries, creating a worldwide movement.

The cafés are based on the ethos of the Death Cafe, and are called "social franchises" by the Death Cafe organisers. The Death Café originated with the Swiss sociologist and anthropologist Bernard Crettaz, who organised the first café mortel in 2004. Jon Underwood, a UK web developer inspired by Crettaz's work, introduced the Death Cafe to London in 2011 and they have since been held in countries around the world.

Weiss had hosted a Death Cafe in Perth and was inspired by this model to create a similar informal talking space for the menopause, which has since similarly spread around the world. The first menopause café took place in June 2017.

== Format and purpose ==
The Menopause Café is not a physical location but an event, nor female only and usually lasting two hours. Participants are free to discuss their understanding, thoughts, dreams, fears and any other aspects of menopause and living with menopause. Tea and cake assist with creating a supportive environment. Some Menopause Cafes have specifically created an opportunity for health-care professionals to talk about the menopause. Venues are usually cafés but they can also take place in workplace settings.

Scottish journalist and TV presenter, Kirsty Wark, who is patron of the Menopause Café charity, has said "We just want to create a space for both male and female participants of all ages ...to come together to simply open up and share their experience."

== History ==
Crettaz organized the first café mortel in 2004 in Neuchâtel and in 2010 brought the idea to Paris. He published a book titled Cafés Mortels: Sortir la Mort du Silence (Death Cafes: Bringing Death out of Silence). In 2011, inspired by Crettaz and with his guidance, Underwood held the first London Death Café at his home. He subsequently developed the Death Café website, generating guidelines with his mother, psychotherapist Susan Barsky Reid, and the concept took off globally.

At the age of 50, Rachel Weiss saw a BBC programme The Menopause and Me (broadcast on BBC, 20 April 2017) presented by Kirsty Wark. Having already hosted a Death Café, she was inspired to create a similar space for people to talk about the menopause using the same model. The first café took place in Blend Coffee Lounge, Perth in June 2017. There are now Menopause Café events across the world, including Scotland, Wales, Ireland, England, Canada, Netherlands, Dubai, Bahrain, Austria, Mexico, Barbados, Australia, Berlin, the USA, and Zambia.

The Menopause Café became a charity registered in Scotland in 2018. The charity has created a pink and purple ribbon to raise awareness of menopause. Organisers want employers, workmates and the general public to wear one of the pink and purple symbols to show they are open to conversations about the menopause. Perth and Kinross Council was one of the first employers to sign up to the Menopause Café campaign.

The charity also organises an annual menopause festival called #FlushFest.

== Patron ==
Kirsty Wark, whose programme The Menopause and Me was the inspiration for Weiss to create the Menopause Café, is now the patron of the Menopause Café charity.

== Response ==
More than 2000 people have taken part in 250+ Menopause Café events in the UK and around the world since the first one in 2017. Feedback from participants suggests that women experiencing menopausal symptoms and struggling to talk openly about it is a universal experience. "There's a stigma around it," says founder Weiss. "Being an older woman is not viewed as a positive thing in our society." Weiss hopes that the cafés will help menopause become an acceptable topic of conversation.

In a study into the wellbeing of perimenopausal women (Ray et al, 2023), a participant described their positive experience of a menopause café at their workplace.

== Awards and recognition ==
Weiss received the Prime Minister's Points of Light Award in 2018 for founding the Menopause Café.
