= Anti-Racism Information Service =

The Anti-Racism Information Service (ARIS) is a non-profit, non-governmental organisation based in Geneva, Switzerland. It was founded in 1992 by Kati David. ARIS was accorded Special Consultative Status with the United Nations Economic and Social Council in 1997. The service aims to make the UN Convention on the Elimination of All Forms of Racial Discrimination better known and to publicize the work of the Committee for the Elimination of Racial Discrimination (CERD), which monitors the application of the convention. Its head is Eya Nchama. The NGO acts as a liaison for other NGOs to assist with the collection of information and preparation of reports.
