= Malaria Control Project =

BOINC based volunteer computing project

malariacontrol.net
- malariacontrol.net screensaver
- Developer(s): Swiss Tropical Institute
- Initial release: December 19, 2006
- Development status: Inactive since 21 June 2016
- Operating system: Cross-platform
- Platform: BOINC
- Average performance: 12.155 TeraFLOPS (2014)
- Active users: 7,907 (2014)
- Total users: 200,749 (2014)
- Active hosts: 29,988(2014)
- Total hosts: 545,517 (2014)

malariacontrol.net was a volunteer computing project to simulate the transmission dynamics and health effects of malaria. It was part of the Africa@home project. The project was terminated on 21 June 2016.

== History ==
The malariacontrol.net domain name was first registered on 19 May 2005 under Swiss Tropical Institute. This project was under Africa@home where the latter was conceived and developed by European Organization for Nuclear Research (CERN). malariacontrol.net was the first to use volunteer computing to model diseases. The model simulates malaria infection in 50,000 to 100,000 people. Each work unit lasted for an hour in average personal computers and the results were returned to University of Geneva for evaluation by researchers. malariacontrol.net ran all the simulations by using stochastic simulation model.

Since 4 November 2010, using the financial support from Bill & Melinda Gates Foundation, Malariacontrol.net developed an open-source software named "Open Malaria" which can be used to simulate outcomes in various types of malaria transmission settings.

On 21 June 2016, malariacontrol.net announced that the project has been terminated due to financial constraints in upgrading their servers for further volunteer computing operations.

== Impact ==
Over 10 years, malariacontrol.net has produced 30 peer-reviewed articles.

In 2008, among the studies performed were the effectiveness of different types of Malaria vaccines in high and low malaria transmission settings, effectiveness of Sulfadoxine/pyrimethamine in preventive treatment of malaria in infants, and using individual-based stochastic simulations in Plasmodium falciparum control.

In 2012, malariacontrol.net has studied the effectiveness of using RTS,S malaria vaccine in World Health Organization's Expanded Programme on Immunization (EPI) in different malarial transmission settings and reported that such programme only has modest benefits over 14 years period. The study suggested that the RTS,S vaccine should be used in targeted mass vaccination in low malarial transmission settings in order to get the most benefits out of it.

In 2013, malariacontrol.net had examined the effectiveness of Rapid Diagnostic Tests (RDT) and other surveillance tools in detecting malaria infections among high and low Plasmodium falciparum transmissions. The project also recommended that screening the whole human population for malaria before treating them would be more cost effective when compared to indiscriminate treatment of the whole population with antimalarial drugs. Another study also revealed that both Pyrethroid-only mosquito nets and Piperonyl butoxide mosquito nets are cost effective in preventing malarial infections in both Pyrethroid-susceptible and Pyrethroid-resistant mosquitoes.

== Reception ==
As of 2010, malariacontrol.net had about 10,000 active users with 37,002 registered members. Similar to the general BOINC users, malariacontrol.net mainly had a volunteer base of males ranged from 20 to 50 years old, mostly staying in European countries and North America. Most of them learned about this project through BOINC website and their main motivation was the satisfaction of doing something good for the betterment of humankind.

== See also ==
- malariacontrol.net archive
- malariacontrol.net screensaver video on YouTube
