= Cruz Melchor Eya Nchama =

Equatoguinean judge (born 1945)

Cruz Melchor Eya
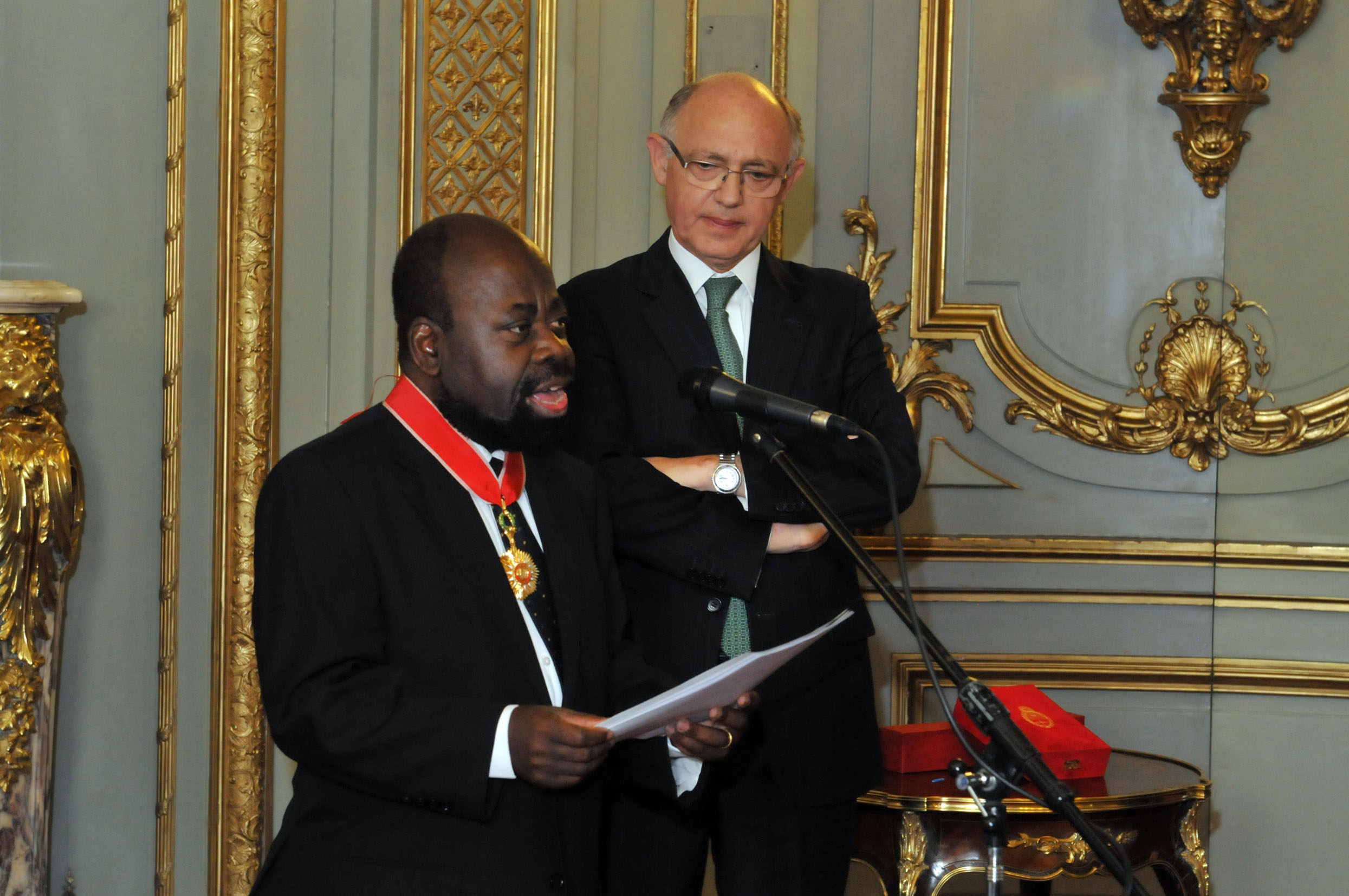
- Eya Nchama in 2014, being awarded the Order of May in the rank of Commander
- Born: Cruz Melchor Eya Nchama; 6 January 1945 (age 81); Kukumankok, Spanish Guinea (now Equatorial Guinea)
- Occupation: Judge

Cruz Melchor Eya Nchama (born 6 January 1945) is an Equatorial Guinean judge at the Court of Geneva.

Justice Eya Nchama currently serves as a "judge assessor" at the Conciliation Commission for Leases and Rents, which is where rental and lodging/housing matters are adjudicated. Prior to his current role, he was an elected Swiss politician.

He is also a writer, and a Human Rights activist within the international human rights community, as well as being a prominent person within the Swiss/Geneva Canton.

Eya Nchama studied at the Complutense University of Madrid. He was head of the research department of the Graduate Institute of Development Studies attached to the University of Geneva and an advisor to the Special Rapporteur of the United Nations Commission on Human Rights. He is head of the Anti-Racism Information Service (ARIS)

While in exile in the early 1970s, Eya Nchama, J.B. Mbia Mbida Essindi and others founded the ANRD (Alianza Nacional por la Restauración Democrática de Guinea Ecuatorial), which would be the main opposition to the Equatorial Guinean dictatorship. He was a fervent opponent of Macías Nguema, succeeding in 1976 in breaking the forced silence on the subject by then fascist Spanish government, presenting a detailed report to the UN Human Rights Commission. After the fall of Macías Nguema and the succession by Obiang in September 1979, he coined the phrase "it's the same dog with a different collar", which gained him considerable notability.

Some years after his naturalisation, Eya Nchama was appointed head of the municipal council of Grand-Saconnex near Geneva, being the first black person to reach such a position in Switzerland.

== Works (selection) ==
- Développement et droits de l’homme en Afrique, édition Publisud, Paris, 1991
- El mundo en los acrósticos, y otros temas, Pentalfa, Oviedo, 2001
- Misceláneas Guineo Ecuatorianas 1: del estado colonial al Estado dictatorial with Juan Tomás Ávila Laurel et al., Editorial Tiempos Próximos, Madrid, 2001
