= Geneva International Academic Network =

Swiss organization

The Geneva International Academic Network (GIAN) was subsumed by the Swiss Network for International Studies (SNIS) in late 2007 which assumes the mission, the rights and the responsibilities of the GIAN. The new organisation was created by the University of Geneva and the Graduate Institute of International and Development Studies (IHEID) in collaboration with the Centre for Comparative and International Studies of ETH Zurich and the University of Zurich, the World Trade Institute in Bern, the Swiss Tropical Institute in Basel, and the University of St.Gallen.

The GIAN (also known by its French acronym RUIG: Réseau universitaire international de Genève) was an international research network founded by the University of Geneva, the Graduate Institute of International Studies (GIIS/IUHEI) and the Graduate Institute of Development Studies (GIDS/IUED). These last two organisations have been merged into the Graduate Institute of International and Development Studies. Various international organizations, notably the UN Office at Geneva and the International Committee of the Red Cross, also participated significantly in the network's establishment. The GIAN benefited from the collaborative and financial support of the Swiss Federal Department of Home Affairs and the Ministry of Education of the Canton of Geneva.

The GIAN goal was to create partnerships between various organisations and groups, principally academic institutions and international organisations to further the role of Geneva and Switzerland in the service of peace and justice. One of the GIAN's primary objectives was to promote research and academic activities that combined the talents available within international organisations and the academic community in Geneva. Providing financial assistance to practical and action-oriented activities in the area of international relations, particularly those containing a strong research component, was a specific characteristic of this academic network.

== Site ==
In June 2007, the Secretariat of the GIAN moved out of its offices at the Villa Rigot, and was temporarily headquartered in the building which also hosts the Swiss Mission to the United Nations Office at Geneva, the European Free Trade Association and the Varembé conference centre.

== Activities ==
The GIAN used an annual tendering procedure for the funding of academic activities. A maximum of SFr 300,000 was allotted per project. After the 2006 tendering procedure, this tool was no longer used. In 2007, the GIAN extended its "Small Grants" programme for funding not to exceed SFr 50,000, but due to the closure of the GIAN at the end of 2007, the deadline for Small Grant requests was set for 30 June 2007.

Between 2001 and 2005, the Foundation Board of the GIAN approved 32 projects within the framework of its tendering procedure and 13 projects within the "Small Grants" programme. In 2006, another 11 projects were approved for over SFR 2 million.

== Organisation ==
The GIAN was a Foundation, and as such is governed by a Foundation Board that included individuals appointed by the aforementioned partners and representatives from other international organisations and academic institutions, as well as the private sector. Two other organs, the Bureau and a five-member Scientific Committee, carried out a variety of tasks relating to GIAN activities as delegated by the Board. The Secretariat ran day-to-day operations and maintained co-ordination among the Foundation's partners.

== See also ==
- University of Geneva
- Graduate Institute of International Studies
- Graduate Institute of Development Studies
- UNOG
- ICRC
- Geneva
