= Order of May =

Award in Argentina

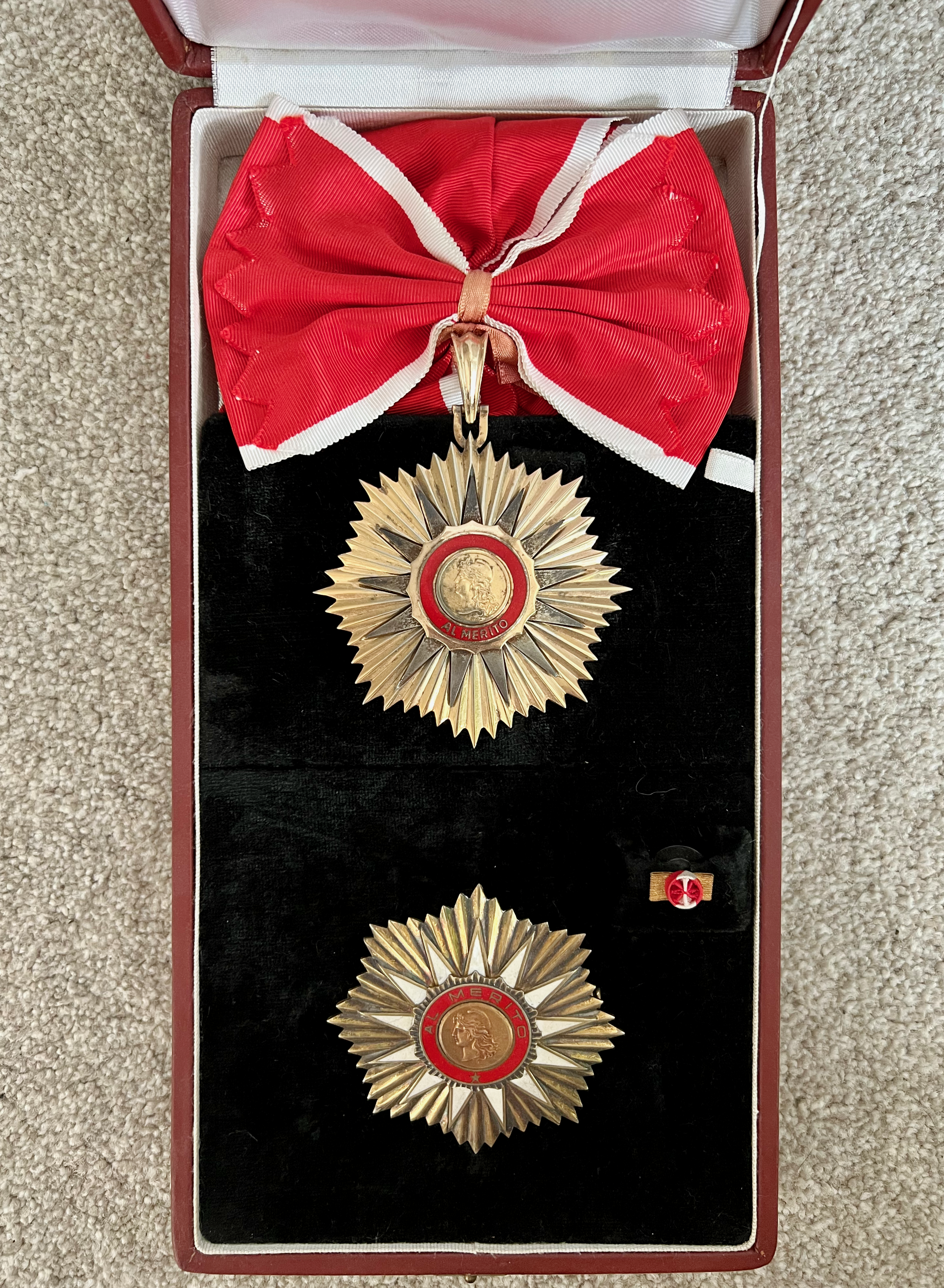
- Type: Order
- Presented by: Argentina
- Eligibility: Foreigners
- Status: Currently awarded
- Established: 17 December 1957

Precedence
- Next (higher): Order of the Liberator General San Martín
- Next (lower): Cross of Heroic Valour in Combat

The Order of May (Spanish: Orden de Mayo) is an order of merit and one of the highest decorations in Argentina. The order is named after the May Revolution which led to the birth of the Republic of Argentina. It was founded as the Order of Merit by Decree No. 8506/46 of 1946, and revised to its current form on 17 December 1957.

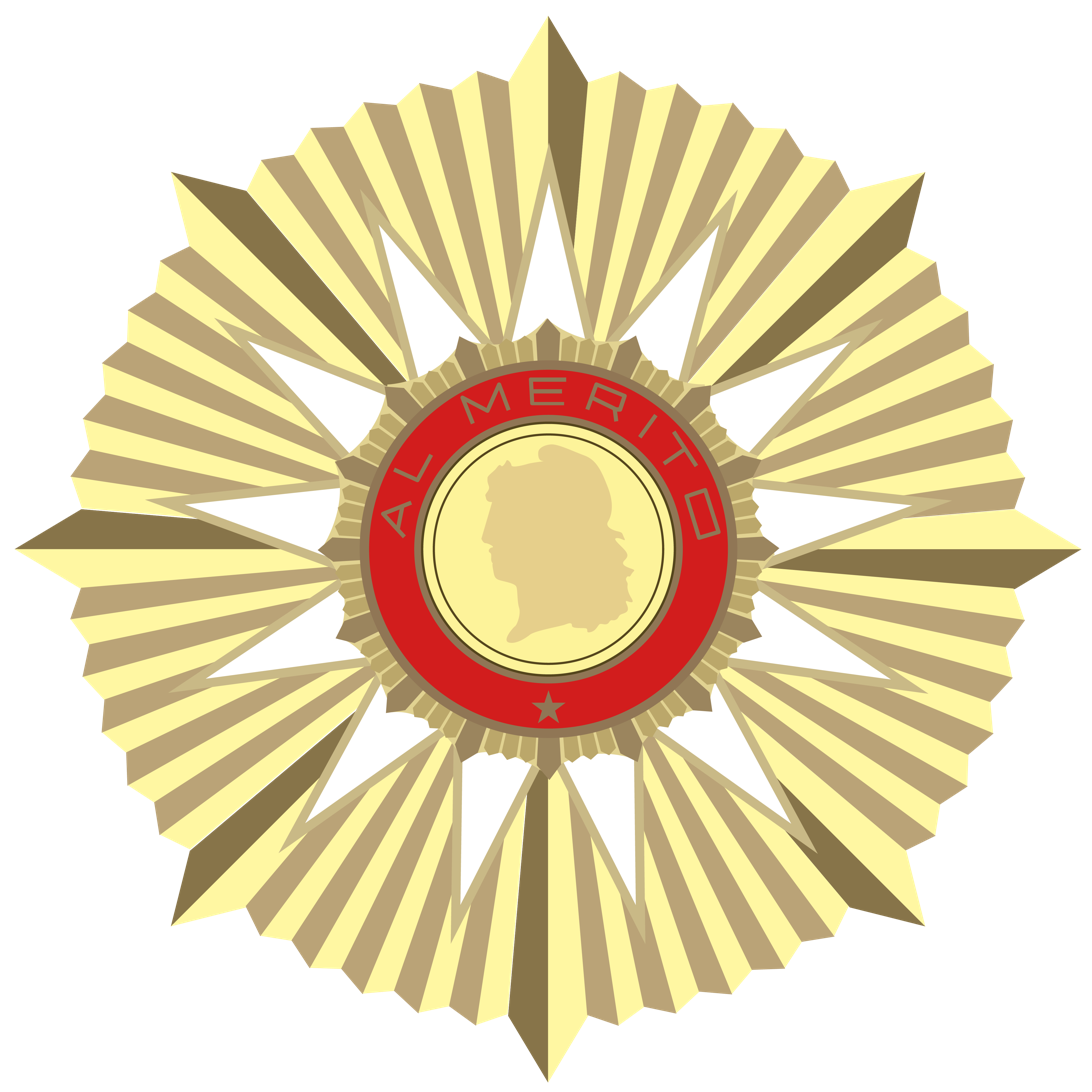
Order of May.

== History ==
The Order of May was created as an Order of Merit by Decree No. 8506/46, 1946. In 1957, the rules of the order were modified and the Order of Merit was renamed the Order of May by Decree No. 16,629. The order was further divided into the categories of Merit, Military Merit, Naval Merit, and Aeronautical Merit.

In 1958, the regulation was further amended and the Collar of (Civil) Merit category (the highest in the order at that time) was abolished, and it is currently only awarded as part of the Military Merit grade.

== Order Chapter ==
The Order is in controlled by a Council made up of the Ministers of Foreign Affairs and Worship and Defense, which is chaired by the Grand Master of the Order, the President of the Nation, the first of the aforementioned ministers being the Grand Chancellor of the Order. The Grand Master is the one who confers the decoration. The headquarters of the Order is the building of the Ministry of Foreign Affairs and Worship. There is a Secretary General and a Secretary of Records, positions that will be carried out by the Introducer of Ambassadors and by the Government Notary, respectively.

== Grades ==
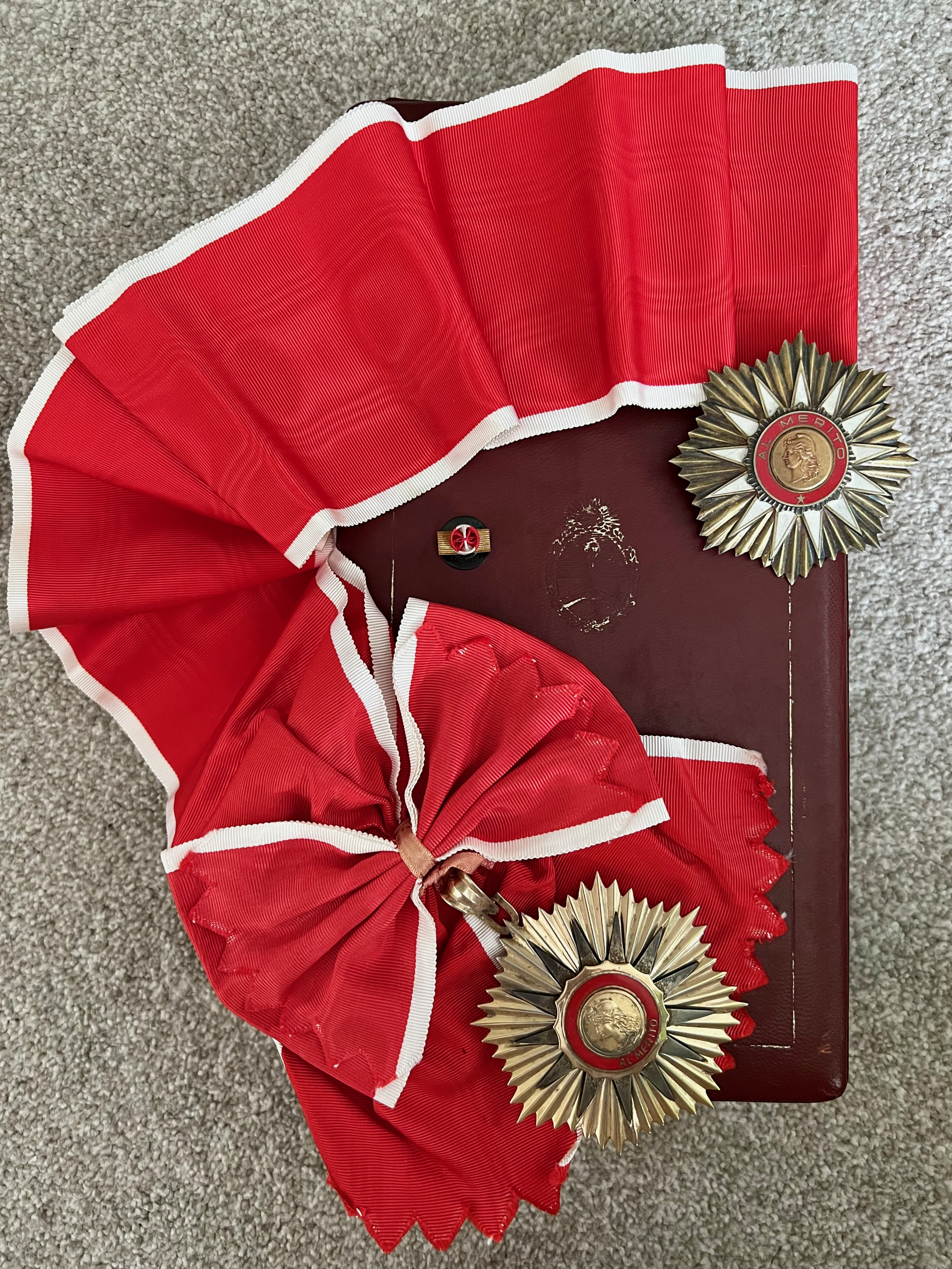
Grand Cross set of insignia.

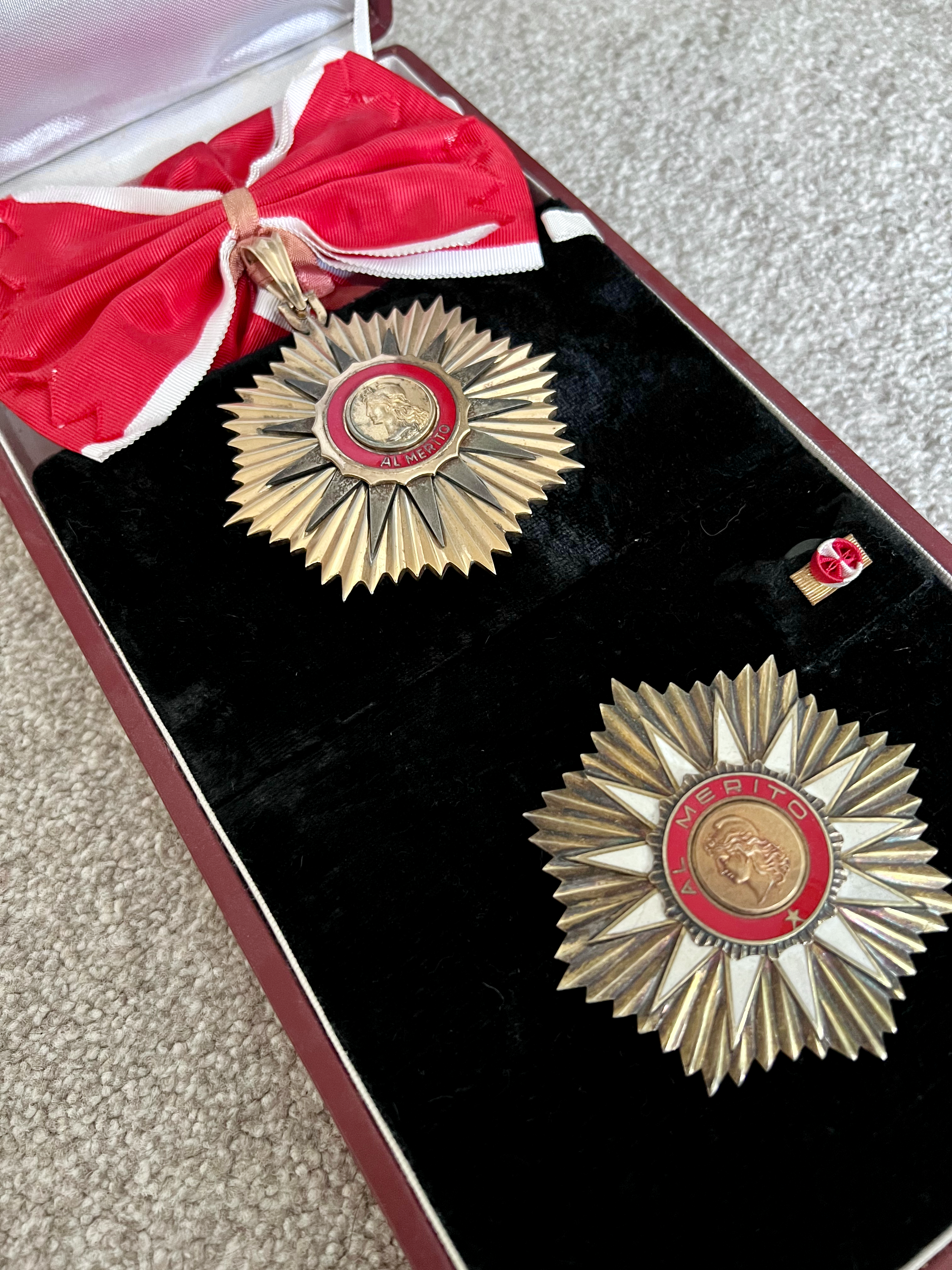
Set of the Grand Cross.

Since the Decree of 1958, it can be awarded to both Argentines and foreigners. It has various ranks (from highest to lowest order):

The Ranks are:

=== Grand Cross (Gran Cruz) ===
Those awarded the Grand Cross will wear the sash from right to left, from which the Order's insignia hangs, as well as a plaque to be worn on the left side of the chest. It is awarded to Vice Presidents, Presidents of Branches, Ministers of the Executive Branch, Ministers of the Supreme Court, Extraordinary and Plenipotentiary Ambassadors, Commanders in Chief, Lieutenant Generals, Admirals, Brigadier Generals, President of National Assemblies and other officials of equivalent status.

- Order of May (Military Merit) (Grand Cross) (Note: Spanish: Orden de Mayo (Al Mérito Militar) - Gran Cruz) (Argentina)
- Order of May (Naval Merit) (Grand Cross) (Note: Spanish: Orden de Mayo (Al Mérito Naval) - Gran Cruz) (Argentina)
- Order of May (Aeronautical Merit) (Grand Cross) (Note: Spanish: Orden de Mayo (Al Mérito Aeronáutico) - Gran Cruz) (Argentina)
- Order of May (Merit - Civil order) (Grand Cross) (Note: Spanish: Orden de Mayo (Al Mérito) - Gran Cruz) (Argentina)

=== Grand Officer (Gran Oficial) ===
Those distinguished with the position of Grand Official will wear the plaque on the left side of the chest. It is awarded to Members of Legislative Assemblies, Extraordinary Envoys and Plenipotentiary Ministers, Counseling Ministers, Division and Brigadier Generals, Vice Admirals and Rear Admirals, Major Generals and Brigadier Generals, and other officials of equivalent status.

- Order of May (Military Merit) (Grand Officer) (Note: Spanish: Orden de Mayo (Al Mérito Militar) - Gran Oficial) (Argentina)
- Order of May (Naval Merit) (Grand Officer) (Note: Spanish: Orden de Mayo (Al Mérito Naval) - Gran Oficial) (Argentina)
- Order of May (Aeronautical Merit) (Grand Officer) (Note: Spanish: Orden de Mayo (Al Mérito Aeronáutico) - Gran Oficial) (Argentina)
- Order of May (Merit - Civil order) (Grand Officer) (Note: Spanish: Orden de Mayo (Al Mérito) - Gran Oficial) (Argentina)

=== Commander (Comendador) ===
Commanders wear the medal hanging from a ribbon attached to the neck. It is awarded to Charges d'Affaires, General Counselors and Consuls, Colonels and Lieutenant Colonels, Ship and Frigate Captains, Commodores and Vice Commodores and other officials of equivalent status.

- Order of May (Military Merit) (Commander) (Note: Spanish: Orden de Mayo (Al Mérito Militar) - Comendador) (Argentina)
- Order of May (Naval Merit) (Commander) (Note: Spanish: Orden de Mayo (Al Mérito Naval) - Comendador) (Argentina)
- Order of May (Aeronautical Merit) (Commander) (Note: Spanish: Orden de Mayo (Al Mérito Aeronáutico) - Comendador) (Argentina)
- Order of May (Merit - Civil order) (Commander) (Note: Spanish: Orden de Mayo (Al Mérito) - Comendador) (Argentina)

=== Officer (Oficial) ===
Officials of the Order wear the medal hanging from a ribbon on the left side of the chest. It is awarded to Secretaries and Consuls, Army Majors and Captains, Lieutenant Commanders and Navy Lieutenants, Aeronautical Commanders and Captains and other officials of equivalent status.

- Order of May (Military Merit) (Officer) (Note: Spanish: Orden de Mayo (Al Mérito Militar) - Oficial) (Argentina)
- Order of May (Naval Merit) (Officer) (Note: Spanish: Orden de Mayo (Al Mérito Naval) - Oficial) (Argentina)
- Order of May (Aeronautical Merit) (Officer) (Note: Spanish: Orden de Mayo (Al Mérito Aeronáutico) - Oficial) (Argentina)
- Order of May (Merit - Civil order) (Officer) (Note: Spanish: Orden de Mayo (Al Mérito) - Oficial) (Argentina)

=== Knight (Caballero) ===
Knights wear the medal hanging from a ribbon on the left side of the chest. It is awarded to Attachés and Vice Consuls, Officers of the Armed Forces of grades lower than those previously mentioned, and other officials of equivalent status.

- Order of May (Military Merit) (Knight) (Note: Spanish: Orden de Mayo (Al Mérito Militar) - Caballero) (Argentina)
- Order of May (Naval Merit) (Knight) (Note: Spanish: Orden de Mayo (Al Mérito Naval) - Caballero) (Argentina)
- Order of May (Aeronautical Merit) (Knight) (Note: Spanish: Orden de Mayo (Al Mérito Aeronáutico) - Caballero) (Argentina)
- Order of May (Merit - Civil order) (Knight) (Note: Spanish: Orden de Mayo (Al Mérito) - Caballero) (Argentina)

== Certification ==
The various grades of the Order, from Grand Cross to Knight, will be certified by a Diploma that will be signed by the Grand Master of the Order and endorsed by the Minister who proposed the award. The Secretary General will be in charge of preparing the corresponding diplomas. The Diploma will be delivered to the beneficiary with the corresponding insignia and a copy containing the Law and Regulations.

The decoration can be received more than once; for example, Chilean dictator Augusto Pinochet was awarded the Grand Cross of the Order of May twice, it was awarded once to Juan Perón and once to Carlos Menem, in the categories of Military Merit and Merit respectively.

== Regalia ==
Ribbon bars of the Order of May
| | Knight Caballero | Officer Oficial | Commander Comendador | Grand Officer Gran Oficial | Grand Cross Gran Cruz | Collar (Note: The grade Collar (Spanish: Collar) was abolished in 1958.) Collar |
|---|---|---|---|---|---|---|
| Military Merit | | | | | | |
| Naval Merit | | | | | | |
| Aeronautical Merit | | | | | | |
| Merit (Civil order) | | | | | | |

== Notable Recipients ==
- Hugo Biermann
- George Bolton (banker)
- Gustaf Bonde (1911–1977)
- Cristóbal Colón de Carvajal, 17th Duke of Veragua
- Vern Clark
- Carl-George Crafoord
- Robert E. Cushman Jr.
- Jorge Fernández Maldonado Solari
- Walter Hallstein
- James L. Holloway III
- Rafael Hoyos Rubio
- Rick Jolly
- Vilma Socorro Martínez
- Cruz Melchor Eya Nchama
- Maurice Papon
- Emilie Schindler
- Enrique Olivares Santana
- Peter Tomlinson
- Elmo Zumwalt

=== Grand Crosses ===
- Cristian Barros
- Bohuslav Chnoupek
- Jacques Diouf
- Felipe VI of Spain
- Tim Fischer
- Licelott Marte de Barrios

== See also ==
- Argentine Nation to the Valour in Combat Medal
- List of military decorations
