= Sarah Darby =

British academic and medical statistician

Sarah Darby FRS
- Born: Sarah C. Darby
- Education: Imperial College London (BSc); University of Birmingham (MSc); London School of Hygiene and Tropical Medicine (PhD)
- Scientific career
- Fields: Epidemiology; Statistics; Cancer
- Institutions: University of Oxford; Radcliffe Infirmary; St Thomas's Hospital Medical School; National Radiological Protection Board; Radiation Effects Research Foundation
- Thesis: A Bayesian Approach to Parallel Line Bioassay (1977)
- Doctoral students: Helen Weiss
- Website: www.ndph.ox.ac.uk/team/sarah-darby

Sarah C. Darby FRS is professor of medical statistics at the University of Oxford. Her research has focused the beneficial effects of smoking cessation, the risk of lung cancer from residential radon, and treatments for early breast cancer. She is also a principal scientist with the Cancer Research UK in the Clinical Trial Service Unit (CTSU) and Epidemiological Studies Unit at the Nuffield Department of Clinical Medicine, at the Radcliffe Infirmary, Oxford.

== Education ==
Darby studied mathematics at Imperial College London (BSc) and mathematical statistics at the University of Birmingham (MSc). She completed her PhD at the London School of Hygiene and Tropical Medicine in 1977, where her research investigated Bayesian approaches to analysing bioassays.

== Career and research ==
After her PhD, she worked at St Thomas's Hospital Medical School, the National Radiological Protection Board, and the Radiation Effects Research Foundation in Hiroshima, before moving to the University of Oxford in 1984. Her major funder since then has been Cancer Research UK.

Darby and her team have demonstrated that there is a linear relationship between the dose of radiation delivered incidentally to the heart during breast cancer radiotherapy and the subsequent risk of ischaemic heart disease, and that the absolute size of the radiation-related risk is bigger for women already at increased risk of heart disease.

She and her team have also estimated the absolute size of the benefit of radiotherapy to breast cancer patients and their work is enabling comparison of the likely absolute benefit of radiotherapy with its likely absolute risk for individual patients. Therefore, it is now becoming possible to assess which patients can receive standard radiotherapy, which should be considered for advanced techniques, and which should avoid radiotherapy altogether.

Other topics that Darby has worked on include estimating the risk of lung cancer from residential radon, the risk of invasive breast cancer after a diagnosis of ductal carcinoma in situ, and the risk of cancer after computerised tomography (CT) scans in young people.

=== Awards and honours ===
Darby was awarded the Guy Medal in Bronze in 1988 by the Royal Statistical Society. She was elected a Fellow of the Royal Society (FRS) in 2019 and of the Academy of Medical Sciences in the same year.
