= Al-Gaddafi International Prize for Human Rights =

Annual Libyan human rights award

- Awarded for: International personalities, bodies or organizations that have distinctively contributed to rendering an outstanding human service and has achieved great actions in defending Human rights, protecting the causes of freedom and supporting peace everywhere in the world.
- Country: Libya
- Presented by: International People's Committee for Gaddafi's International Prize for Human Rights
- First award: 1989
- Final award: 2010

The Al-Gaddafi International Prize for Human Rights was an annual human rights prize founded by the Libyan People's Congress in late 1988, in "indebtedness and gratitude for Muammar Gaddafi and in appreciation for his role in firmly establishing the principle of direct democracy, his persistent struggle, his distinctive inspiration and continuous instigation for the consolidation of human liberty and for issuing the Great Green Document in the era of the masses, for the purpose of bestowing tribute upon symbolic figures of struggle and faith in the values of freedom to all humans, nations, groups and individuals".

Gaddafi made an initial grant of ten million US$ to the Swiss-based foundation North-South XXI which later administered the prize donation. The sum of the prize money was US$250,000 (in case of several recipients the prize money was shared). The prize was given by an international committee, chaired by former President of Algeria Ahmed Ben Bella. Gaddafi himself had no say in choosing the recipient.

The prize was discontinued in 2011, after Gaddafi's overthrow and death during the Libyan Civil War.

Criticism of the organization includes Swiss TV's report claiming that "the Gaddafi prize for Human Rights is an instrument for propaganda for the dictator", while other groups have said that it promoted "anti-American and anti-Western hatred".

== List of recipients ==
Year	Recipient(s)	Portrait(s)
1989	Nelson Mandela	
1990	The children of Palestine	
1991	The indigenous peoples of the Americas	
1992	The African Centre for Combating AIDS	
1993	The children of Bosnia and Herzegovina	
1994	The Union of Human Rights Societies and Peoples in Africa	
1995	Ahmed Ben Bella and Francisco da Costa Gomes	
1996	Louis Farrakhan	
1997	Gracelyn Smallwood, Melchior Ndadaye, Melba Hernandez, Manal Younes Abdul-Razzak, Doreen McNally	
1998	Fidel Castro	
1999	The children of Iraq	
2000	Souha Bechara, Joseph Ki-Zerbo, Evo Morales, the Movement of September, the Third World Center	
2002	Mamadou N'Diaye, Roger Garaudy, Ibrahim Al-Koni, Jean Ziegler (who claimed to have turned the award down but was later found to have accepted it), Nadeem Albetar, Ali M. Almosrati, Khaifa M. Attelisie, Mohamed A. Alsherif, Ali Fahmi Khshiem, Rajab Muftah Abodabos, Mohamed Moftah Elfitori, Ali Sodgy Abdulgader, Ahmed Ibrahim Elfagieh	
2003	Pope Shenouda III of Alexandria	
2004	Hugo Chávez	
2005	Mahathir Mohamad	
2006	Evo Morales	
2007	Libraries of Timbuktu	
2008	Dom Mintoff	
2009	Daniel Ortega	
2010	Recep Tayyip Erdoğan	

== Postage stamps issue ==
The Libyan state-owned General Posts and Telecommunications Company (GPTC) dedicated a postage stamps issue to Ghadafi Prize for Human Rights in 1994 (date of issue December 31). The issue consists of a minisheet with sixteen stamps.

Each horizontal strip of four stamps is dedicated to a particular subject:

- Nelson Mandela
- Indigenous peoples of the Americas
- Bosnian War
- Intifada in Palestine
