= L'empire de la honte =

Book by Jean Ziegler

L'empire de la honte (French for The Empire of Shame) is a book by Swiss sociologist Jean Ziegler, who served as the United Nations Special Rapporteur on the Right to Food from 2000 until 2008. In the book, Ziegler elaborates on the concept of structural violence due to organized scarcity of food, caused by neoliberal capitalism.
