= Bernard Crettaz =

Swiss sociologist and ethnologist (1938–2022)

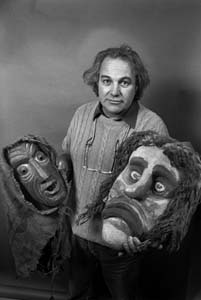
- Born: 29 May 1938; Vissoie, Switzerland
- Died: 28 November 2022 (aged 84); Austria
- Education: University of Geneva
- Occupations: Sociologist; Ethnologist
- Spouses: Elisabeth Crettaz (2002-2023)

Bernard Crettaz (29 May 1938 – 28 November 2022) was a Swiss sociologist and ethnologist.

== Biography ==
After his secondary education in Sion, Crettaz earned a doctorate in sociology from the University of Geneva in 1979 with the thesis Nomades et sédentaires. He first worked as an assistant at the university before becoming a teacher at the Institut d'études sociales and later a researcher at the Institut de médecine légale sur la prison de Saint-Antoine.

In 1976, Crettaz became curator of the European Department of the Musée d'ethnographie de Genève, which contained the Collection Georges Amoudruz. He also directed the department of sociology at the University of Geneva until 2003. In 1977, he met anthropologist Yvonne Preiswerk, whom he later married. In 1992, he openly supported an accession of Switzerland to the European Union.

In 1982, the Pompes funèbres générales asked Crettaz and his wife to co-found the Société d'études thanatologiques de Suisse Romande, of which he served as founding president. After his wife's death in 1999, he organized the Café mortel to create public discussions about death. On 31 May 2000, he retired from his activities with the Musée d'ethnographie de Genève. In 2002, he moved to Anniviers, where he wrote literature.

Bernard Crettaz died in Austria on 28 November 2022, at the age of 84.

== Bibliography ==
- Nomades et sédentaires, dans le Val d'Anniviers (1979)
- Grimentz, un village suisse (1982)
- Le pays où les vaches sont reines (1986)
- Zinal défi à la montagne (1989)
- La race d'Hérens est-elle en péril? (1992)
- La beauté du reste. Confession d'un conservateur de musée sur la perfection et l'enfermement de la Suisse et des Alpes (1993)
- A la table des reines (1993)
- Juste l'ordinaire (1994)
- Au-delà du Disneyland alpin (1995)
- Est-ce la fin des grandes lignées? (1995)
- 75 ans pour que vive la race d’Hérens! (1997)
- Vous parler de la mort (2003)
- Le curé, le promoteur, la vache, la femme et le président, que reste-t-il de notre procession? (2008)
- Les Anniviards, barbares et civilisés (2009)
- Cafés mortels : Sortir la mort du silence (2010)
