= Death Cafe =

Social meetup concept with a topic of death

- Named after: Bernard Crettaz's "café mortel"
- Formation: 2011
- Founder: Jon Underwood
- Legal status: Nonprofit organization
- Purpose: Death discussion
- Website: deathcafe.com

A Death Cafe is a scheduled non-profit get-together (called "social franchises" by the organisers) for the purpose of talking about death over food and drink, usually tea and cake. The idea originates with the Swiss sociologist and anthropologist Bernard Crettaz, who organized the first café mortel in 2004. Jon Underwood, a UK web developer, was inspired by Crettaz's work, introduced the death cafe to London in 2011, and launched the Death Cafe website. They have since been held in many countries.

== Format and purpose ==
Death Cafes are events, usually lasting two hours with around a dozen participants, were people discuss their understanding, thoughts, dreams, fears and any other aspects of death and dying over tea and cake. There is no fixed venue, and the events have previously been held in homes, rented halls, restaurants, cafes a cemetery and a yurt. Some Death Cafes have specifically created an opportunity for health-care professionals to talk about death.

The Death Cafe website states the purpose is "to increase awareness of death with a view to helping people make the most of their (finite) lives". The open-ended discussions also provide an avenue to express thoughts about one's own life stirred up by the death of a family member.

Crettaz said that his aim of his café mortel was to break the "tyrannical secrecy" surrounding the topic of death, and that at these gatherings, "the assembled company, for a moment, and thanks to death, is born into authenticity." This is echoed by Underwood, who stated that "we have lost control of one of the most significant events we ever have to face", and facilitators who have said that there is "a need among people to open [the] closet" into which death, the "last taboo", has been placed, to reduce fear and enable people to live more fully.

== History ==
Crettaz organized the first café mortel in 2004 in Neuchâtel, and in 2010 brought the idea to Paris. He published a book titled Cafés Mortels: Sortir la Mort du Silence (Death Cafes: Bringing Death out of Silence). According to one commentator, Crettaz wanted to revive the pagan tradition of the funeral feast, "where the living would renew their bonds while letting go of what weighed on their hearts".

In 2011, inspired by Crettaz and with his guidance, Underwood held the first London Death Cafe at his home in Hackney. He subsequently developed the Death Cafe website, generating guidelines with his mother, psychotherapist Susan Barsky Reid, and the concept was taken up globally. The first US event was organized by Lizzy Miles, a hospice worker, in summer 2012 near Columbus, Ohio. By June 2014, the idea had spread to Hong Kong, and it was subsequently popularized in Shanghai by a non-profit organization that provides hospice services to cancer patients. Café Totentanz or Totentanz-Café is used in German-speaking areas.

In February 2013, a Death Cafe in London was filmed.

Underwood died in June 2017; Death Cafe has since been run by his mother Susan Barsky Reid, his sister Jools Barsky, and his wife Donna Molloy.

The first in-depth monograph introducing the history and ethnography of the Death Café, as well as popularizing their culture, was written by Dr. Jack Fong, a sociology professor at California State Polytechnic University, Pomona. His findings point to how the "trinity" of the media, market, and medicine vulgarized Western society's misunderstanding about mortality, leading to people's irrational fears about death. Having received his blessings to conduct the research from the late Jon Underwood, as well as collaborating with Death Café hosts in the Southern California area for many years so as to interview their attendees, he describes Death Cafés in his work as a bona fide social movement, the first major existential social movement of the 21st century.
