= Philippe Régnier =

Swiss economist and academic

Philippe Régnier is professor at the School of International Development and Global Studies at the University of Ottawa. He was formerly Professor at the Graduate Institute of International and Development Studies in Geneva and Director of its Centre for Contemporary Asian Studies for 12 years. His publications focus on the socio-economic development of emerging economies.

He received a diploma in International Relations from the University of Strasbourg in 1980. He attended the College of Europe in Bruges with a scholarship from the French Foreign Office, where he graduated first of his class, the Jean Monnet Promotion (1980–1981). He received a doctorate from the Graduate Institute of International Studies in Geneva in 1986.
