= Helen Weiss =

British epidemiologist

Helen Weiss FMedSci
- Occupation: Epidemiologist

Academic background
- Education: University of Oxford
- Thesis: Cancer epidemiology: with special reference to the long-term effects of exposure to ionizing radiation (1994)
- Doctoral advisor: Sarah Darby

Academic work
- Discipline: Epidemiology
- Sub-discipline: HIV research; sexual health; mental health
- Institutions: London School of Hygiene and Tropical Medicine

Helen Anne Weiss FMedSci is a British epidemiologist who specialises in HIV research, sexual health and mental health. Her research on HIV risk in circumcised men inspired reforms to World Health Organization (WHO) guidelines. After getting her PhD at the University of Oxford in 1994, she started working at the London School of Hygiene and Tropical Medicine, where she became Professor of Epidemiology. She was elected Fellow of the Academy of Medical Sciences in 2020.

== Academic career ==
Professor Helen Anne Weiss obtained her PhD from the Imperial Cancer Research Fund at the University of Oxford, for her 1994 doctoral dissertation, Cancer epidemiology: with special reference to the long-term effects of exposure to ionizing radiation, which was supervised by Sarah Darby. Following a post-doctoral position at the National Cancer Institute in the United States, she joined the faculty at the London School of Hygiene and Tropical Medicine in 1997. She was a Reader in Epidemiology and International Health there before becoming Professor of Epidemiology. Weiss was elected a Fellow of the Academy of Medical Sciences in 2020.

== Research ==
As an academic, Weiss's research focus is on HIV transmission, sexual health and mental health in low- and middle- income countries. Her research on decreased HIV risk for heterosexual circumcised men inspired WHO guideline reforms. She has also worked for the Medical Research Council's International Statistics & Epidemiology Group as a statistical epidemiologist and as their director. In 2019, she served as a member of the World Health Organization Technical Advisory Group on Innovations in Male Circumcision.

Weiss was the Principal Investigator on the trial of a multi-component menstrual health intervention (MENISCUS) in Ugandan schools in 2022. The trial determined that "menstrual health in secondary school is important for health and human rights" but the intervention did not sufficiently improve mental health and educational performance.

== Publications ==
Dziva Chikwari, C; Simms, V; Kranzer, K; Dringus, S; Chikodzore, R; Sibanda, E; Webb, K; Engelsmann, B; Redzo, N; Bandason, T; Mujuru, H; Apollo, T; Ncube, G; Hatzold, K; Weiss, HA; Ferrand, RA (2020). Comparison of index-linked HIV testing for children and adolescents in health facility and community settings in Zimbabwe: findings from the interventional B-GAP study. The lancet HIV, 8 (3). e138-e148. ISSN 2405-4704 DOI: 10.1016/S2352-3018(20)30267-8

Michelson, D; Malik, K; Parikh, R; Weiss, HA; Doyle, AM; Bhat, B; Sahu, R; Chilhate, B; Mathur, S; Krishna, M; Sharma, R; Sudhir, P; King, M; Cuijpers, P; Chorpita, B; Fairburn, CG; Patel, V (2020). Effectiveness of a brief lay counsellor-delivered, problem-solving intervention for adolescent mental health problems in urban, low-income schools in India: a randomised controlled trial. Lancet Child and Adolescent Health, 4 (8). pp. 571-582. DOI: https://doi.org/10.1016/S2352-4642(20)30173-5

Nalugya, R; Tanton, C; Hytti, L; Kansiime, C; Nakuya, K; Namirembe, P; Nakalema, S; Neema, S; Alezuyo, C; Namuli Musoke, S; Torondel, B; Francis, SC; Ross, DA; Bonell, C; Seeley, J; Weiss, HA (2020). Assessing the effectiveness of a comprehensive menstrual health intervention program in Ugandan schools (MENISCUS): process evaluation of a pilot intervention study. Pilot and feasibility studies, 6 (1). 51-. DOI: https://doi.org/10.1186/s40814-020-00585-2

Kansiime, C; Hytti, L; Nalugya, R; Nakuya, K; Namirembe, P; Nakalema, S; Neema, S; Tanton, C; Alezuyo, C; Namuli Musoke, S; Torondel, B; Francis, SC; Ross, DA; Bonell, C; Seeley, J; Weiss, HA (2020). Menstrual health intervention and school attendance in Uganda (MENISCUS-2): a pilot intervention study. BMJ open, 10 (2). e031182-. ISSN 2044-6055 DOI: https://doi.org/10.1136/bmjopen-2019-031182

Shinde, S; Weiss, HA; Khandeparkar, P; Pereira, B; Sharma, A; Gupta, R; Ross, DA; Patton, G; Patel, V (2020). A multicomponent secondary school health promotion intervention and adolescent health: An extension of the SEHER cluster randomised controlled trial in Bihar, India. PLoS medicine, 17 (2). e1003021-. ISSN 1549-1277 DOI: https://doi.org/10.1371/journal.pmed.1003021

Mavhu, W; Willis, N; Mufuka, J; Bernays, S; Tshuma, M; Mangenah, C; Maheswaran, H; Mangezi, W; Apollo, T; Araya, R; Weiss, HA; Cowan, FM (2020). Effect of a differentiated service delivery model on virological failure in adolescents with HIV in Zimbabwe (Zvandiri): a cluster-randomised controlled trial. The Lancet Global Health, 8 (2). e264-e275. ISSN 2214-109X DOI: https://doi.org/10.1016/S2214-109X(19)30526-1

Weiss, HA; Ferrand, RA (2019). Improving adolescent health: an evidence-based call to action. Lancet, 393 (10176). pp. 1073-1075. ISSN 0140-6736 DOI: https://doi.org/10.1016/S0140-6736(18)32996-9

Fuhr, DC; Weobong, B; Lazarus, A; Vanobberghen, F; Weiss, HA; Singla, DR; Tabana, H; Afonso, E; De Sa, A; D'Souza, E; Joshi, A; Korgaonkar, P; Krishna, R; Price, LN; Rahman, A; Patel, V (2018). Delivering the Thinking Healthy Programme for perinatal depression through peers: an individually randomised controlled trial in India. Lancet Psychiatry, 6 (2). pp. 115-127. ISSN 2215-0366 DOI: https://doi.org/10.1016/S2215-0366(18)30466-8

Sikander, S; Ahmad, I; Atif, N; Zaidi, A; Vanobberghen, F; Weiss, HA; Nisar, A; Tabana, H; Ain, QU; Bibi, A; Bilal, S; Bibi, T; Liaqat, R; Sharif, M; Zulfiqar, S; Fuhr, DC; Price, LN; Patel, V; Rahman, A (2018). Delivering the Thinking Healthy Programme for perinatal depression through volunteer peers: a cluster randomised controlled trial in Pakistan. Lancet Psychiatry, 6 (2). pp. 128-139. ISSN 2215-0366 DOI: https://doi.org/10.1016/S2215-0366(18)30467-X

Shinde, S; Weiss, HA; Varghese, B; Khandeparkar, P; Pereira, B; Sharma, A; Gupta, R; Ross, DA; Patton, G; Patel, V (2018). Promoting school climate and health outcomes with the SEHER multi-component secondary school intervention in Bihar, India: a cluster-randomised controlled trial. Lancet, 392 (10163). pp. 2465-2477. ISSN 0140-6736 DOI: https://doi.org/10.1016/S0140-6736(18)31615-5
