= Yvonne Preiswerk =

Swiss anthropologist (1937–1999)

Yvonne Preiswerk (born 3 June 1937 – 14 April 1999) was a Swiss anthropologist. She was a lecturer at the Graduate Institute of International and Development Studies (IUED) in Geneva and professor of ethnology at the Universities of Friborg and Geneva. She was the author of a study on mortuary rites, she is also a scientific editor and director of publications in various fields of anthropology.

== Biography ==
After commercial training, Yvonne Preiswerk moved to Argentina for four years with her husband and two daughters. On her return, she settled in Geneva. In 1972, as a stay-at-home mother, speaking English, German and Spanish, she resumed her training by obtaining a diploma in anthropology at the University Institute for Development Studies (IUED) in Geneva.

In 1981, she published Moi Adeline, midwife, a book which collects the testimony of a midwife from the Val d'Anniviers Adeline Favre. She did her doctoral thesis in history and civilization at the Jean Moulin University Lyon 3. She was a specialist in companies in the Valais and Vaud Alps.
