= Jean Ziegler =

Swiss academic and sociologist (1934–2026)

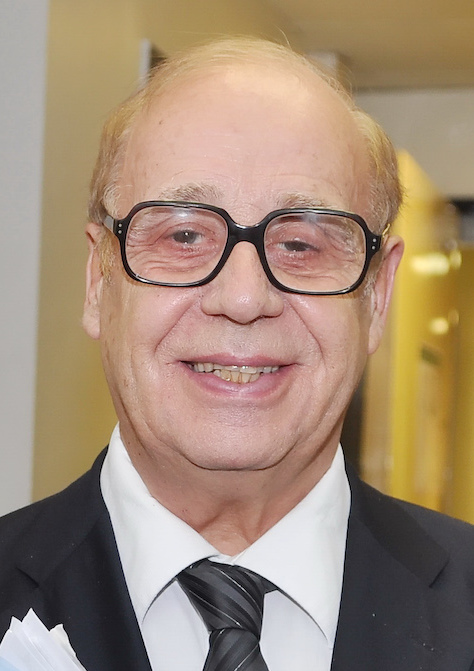
- Ziegler in 2009
- Born: Hans Ziegler; 19 April 1934; Thun, Switzerland
- Died: 10 June 2026 (aged 92); Geneva, Switzerland
- Education: University of Bern; University of Geneva
- Occupations: Academic, adviser, sociologist

Jean Ziegler (French: [ziglɛʁ]; born Hans Ziegler; 19 April 1934 – 10 June 2026) was a Swiss academic, advisor and sociologist who was professor of sociology at the University of Geneva, the Graduate Institute of Development Studies and the Sorbonne, Paris, as well as vice-president of the Advisory Committee to the United Nations Human Rights Council. He was previously Member of the Swiss Parliament for the Social Democrats from 1981 to 1999. Ziegler also held several positions with the United Nations, especially as Special Rapporteur on the Right to Food from 2000 to 2008, and as a member of the Advisory Committee of the UN Human Rights Council from 2008 to 2012.

== Early life and teaching career ==
Jean Ziegler was born in Thun, Switzerland, on 19 April 1934. His father was the president of the town's court and a reserve artillery colonel.

Ziegler originally was a member of a conservative Swiss student group. He studied at the universities of Bern and Geneva. He also earned his barrister brevet at the bar association of Geneva. He then moved to Paris to study sociology at the Sorbonne. He had doctorates in Law and Sociology.

While in Paris he met Jean-Paul Sartre and Simone de Beauvoir, who introduced him to Marxism, and reported on the Algerian War for their magazine Les Temps Modernes. Simone de Beauvoir suggested he change his name from Hans to Jean, which she considered a more dignified byline. He joined the French Communist Party which expelled him for actively supporting the Algerian independence. In 1952, he met Abbé Pierre in Paris, and became the first director of the Emmaus charitable community of Geneva.

In 1961 he joined a British civil servant as a translator on a trip to the newly independent Democratic Republic of the Congo whose democratically elected president Patrice Lumumba was deposed with assistance of Belgium and the United States of America to be replaced by the military officer and dictator Mobutu Sese Seko. He witnessed local children starving and being mistreated by the president's guards while Mobutu was siphoning the country's wealth to his private bank accounts in Switzerland which led him to strive for the equal distribution of wealth between rich and poor countries in his further life.

In 1964, Ziegler met Che Guevara on his visit to Geneva, and befriended the Cuban revolutionary driving him around Switzerland. Ziegler revealed to Atossa Araxia Abrahamian that when he asked Che Guevara whether he could follow him to Cuba the latter said: "Here is where you were born, and here lives the monster's brain. It is here that you must fight."

Ziegler became professor at the University of Grenoble and until 2002 was an instructor at the University of Geneva and at the Graduate Institute of Development Studies, where he taught sociology. He also held the position of associate professor at the Sorbonne in Paris.

== Election and appointment to public offices ==
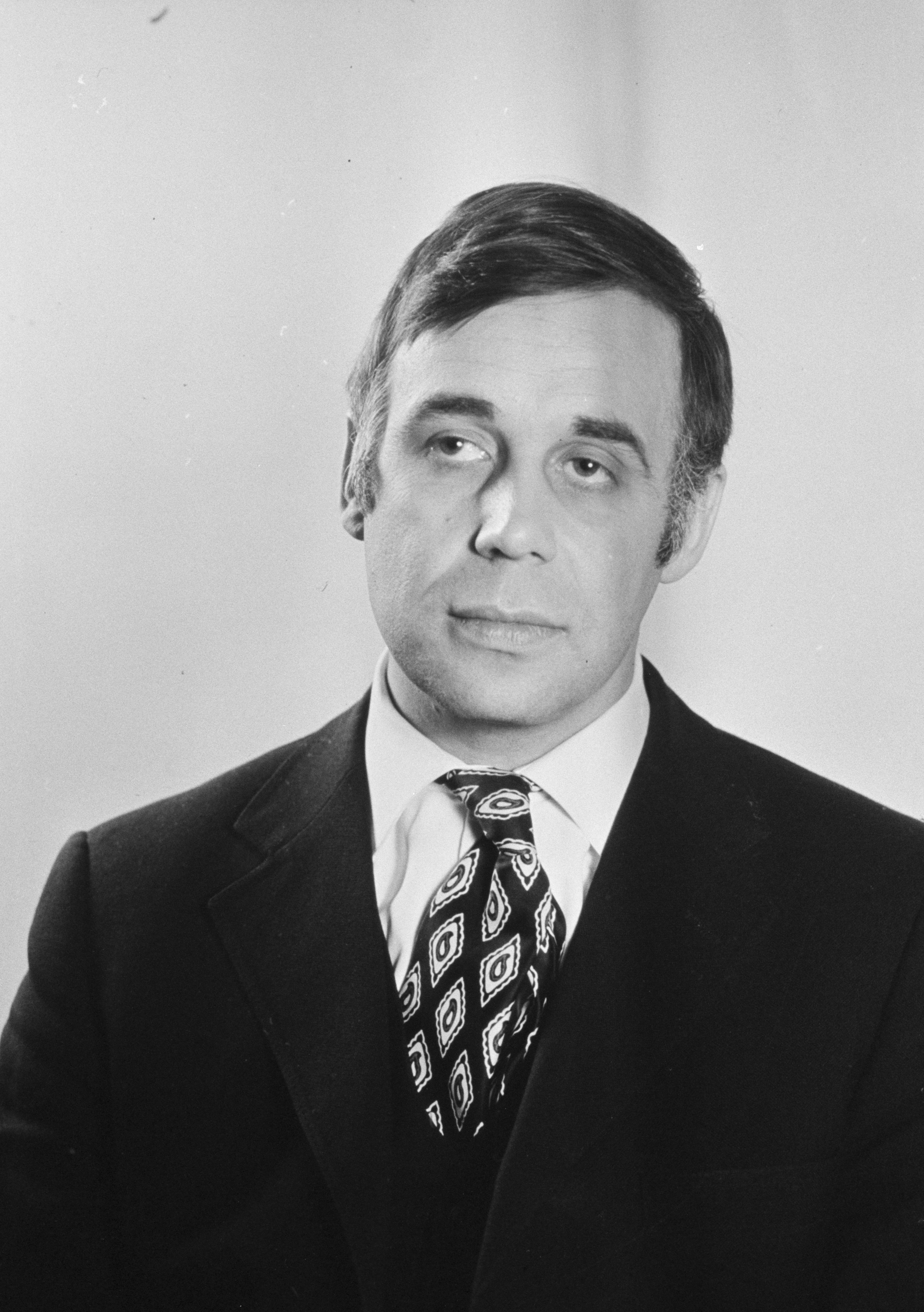
Ziegler in 1971

In 1963, Jean Ziegler was elected at the municipal council of Geneva as a social democrat. From 1967 to 1983 and from 1987 to 1999, he held a seat at the Swiss National Council. While there, he was the president of the "Swiss-Third World" parliamentary group. He joined the commissions for foreign affairs, science and international trade.

Nominated by Switzerland, he was the United Nations Special Rapporteur on the Right to Food from 2000 to 2008. Following Ziegler's election, the Swiss government stated that it "attaches great importance to human rights and is pleased that a Swiss candidate will be able to contribute his expertise to the committee". As one of the 18 initial members of the Advisory Committee to the United Nations Human Rights Council who were elected on 26 March 2008, Jean Ziegler served a one-year term receiving forty of forty-seven votes in 2008 to finish first in a field of seven candidates. He concluded his second term 30 September 2012, but was reelected on 26 September 2013 with a term lasting until 30 September 2016. He was also a member of the advisory board of the non-profit organization Business Crime Control which targets white-collar crime.

== Issues during diplomatic career ==
As a United Nations official, Ziegler has dealt with both general worldwide issues such as the use of biofuels, as well as country-specific issues. Regarding the former, Ziegler has criticized the uptake of biofuels because their production can come at the expense of growing food. On 26 October 2007, Ziegler told a news conference at the UN that "it's a crime against humanity to convert agricultural productive soil into oil ... which will be burned into biofuel. What has to be stopped is ... the growing catastrophe of the massacre [by] hunger in the world."

=== Swiss banks ===
In 1997, Ziegler alleged that Swiss banking officials were lying to protect the assets of Mobutu Sese Seko, former President of Zaire (now the Democratic Republic of the Congo). Ziegler said: "This is grotesque. This is a financial empire and it is here in Switzerland." In 1994, he had already proposed to the Swiss parliament to confiscate the finances of Mobutu and give it back to the country after the end of Mobutu's dictatorship, but his proposal was declined.

Ziegler also criticized the Swiss banks in connection with the dormant accounts scandal. In 1998, he testified before Senator Alfonse D'Amato's hearing on the assets of Holocaust victims by the US Senate Banking Committee, against the Swiss banks and in support of the claims of the World Jewish Congress. His book The Swiss, the Gold and the Dead: How Swiss Bankers Helped Finance the Nazi War Machine was published in America in 1998.

For his accusations against the Swiss banking system, Ziegler faced nine defamation trials, and was sentenced to pay 6.6 million Swiss francs (£5.8m), which practically forced him to declare bankruptcy, "at least on paper".

=== Gaddafi Prize and Roger Garaudy ===
A prize foundation fund in the name of Libyan leader Muammar al-Gaddafi was established in Geneva in 1989, and Nelson Mandela was selected the first recipient of the fund's Gaddafi International Human Rights Prize. Some newspaper accounts have identified Ziegler as one of the panel members who administered the fund in 1989. He has denied launching the award, however, and has said that he was merely "consulted". Although Libya funded the award, its winners were to be chosen by the Swiss foundation, and Ziegler said that "ironclad guarantees" had been established to ensure that the Libyan government would not influence the selection.

Gaddafi Prize officials announced thirteen disparate winners in 2002, including Ziegler and the French philosopher and convicted Holocaust denier Roger Garaudy. Agence France-Press noted the irony of Ziegler, who had worked for Holocaust reparations in Switzerland, sharing the award with Garaudy. Ziegler turned down the prize, saying that he "could not accept an award or distinction from any country because of my responsibilities at the United Nations".

Ziegler's alleged associations with the Gaddafi Prize has been the subject of criticism. Alan Johnson, writing for The Guardian online in 2008, criticized Ziegler for launching the prize four months after the bombing of Pan Am Flight 103 (which many believe to have been the work of Libyan agents). Joshua Muravchik from the American Enterprise Institute also criticized his involvement with the award in a 2006 article for the Weekly Standard.

On 25 March 2011, the Swiss television channel Schweizer Fernsehen ran a report on Ziegler's alleged associations with Gaddafi. The piece included criticism of Ziegler from Pierre Weiss, a sociologist and member of the Swiss Liberal Party. Ziegler, for his part, said that he was never a friend of Gaddafi and repeated his claim that he never oversaw the Human Rights Prize.

The following month, the Salzburg Music Festival withdrew an invitation to Ziegler to speak at the event's opening, citing his alleged links to Gaddafi. In the same period, Ziegler said that he now regarded Gaddafi as "completely mad" and as a psychopath and murderer.

In 1996, Ziegler signed a letter of support for Roger Garaudy. He later clarified that he intended to express "his respect for Garaudy's battle against all fundamentalisms — and Muslim fundamentalism, in particular", and that he "most firmly condemned all revisionist activity or ideas whose purpose is to deny or to minimize the genocide of the Jewish people by the Nazis".

=== Ethiopia, Zimbabwe and South Africa ===
During the Ethiopian famine of the mid-1980s, Ziegler described the world as an "immense extermination camp", wherein 40,000 people died of hunger every day. He blamed this on an economic system that allowed the rich to become richer, and the poor to become poorer.

Some of Ziegler's critics have accused him of working as an adviser to Ethiopian government in the drafting of Ethiopia's 1986 constitution, which established the country as a one-party state.

Ziegler defended the principle of Zimbabwean President Robert Mugabe's land reforms in 2002, saying that Mugabe had "history and morality on his side". He described agrarian reforms as "an absolute necessity" in Zimbabwe and South Africa, and was quoted as saying:

South Africa is threatened by a social disaster because it has not touched white lands. The whites are the colonisers... they are not people who came after independence and bought their land. They are on despoiled land.

He added that Mugabe's land reforms were being undertaken "in a despicable context", however, and said that agrarian reform under democratic conditions would bring "equitable distribution of the property titles to rural communities". He also clarified that he was speaking in a personal context, and not as a representative of the United Nations.

=== Iraq and its wars with the United States ===
During the buildup to the 1990 Gulf War, Iraqi President Saddam Hussein took several Swiss nationals in Iraq as hostages. Ziegler was involved in efforts to release them, initially working with former Algerian President Ahmed Ben Bella and later traveling to Baghdad himself as part of an independent delegation that managed to secure the release of some hostages. The Swiss government did not endorse this effort, and Ziegler argued that his delegation could have freed all of the hostages had the government agreed to allow the export to Iraq of medicines and powdered milk for children.

Prior to the 2003 invasion of Iraq, Ziegler proposed that Saddam Hussein be granted a Swiss exile to prevent war from breaking out. The Swiss government did not take up this proposal. After the invasion, Ziegler accused Coalition forces of using water and food as weapons of war in Iraqi cities under attack by insurgents, to encourage civilians to flee.

=== Cuba and its relations with the United States ===
Ziegler has praised Cuba, stating in November 2007 that it is a world model for how it provides its people with food and praised it for cooperating with the United Nations and agreeing to allow him to report on the country's respect for the right to food. Regarding a visit he made to Cuba, Ziegler stated: "We cannot say that the right to food is totally respected in Cuba, but we have not seen a single malnourished person." Ziegler's trip to Cuba was the first in several years by a U.N. rights rapporteur, and his invitation to Havana followed a decision by the U.N. Human Rights Council to stop scrutinizing Cuban human rights abuses.

According to The Weekly Standard, Ziegler believes that the United States is an "'imperialist dictatorship' that is guilty, among other atrocities, of 'genocide' against the people of Cuba by means of its trade embargo".

=== Comments about Israel ===
Ziegler criticized Israel's conduct in the 2006 Lebanon War, stating that the International Criminal Court should investigate whether Israel is guilty of war crimes for a bombing campaign in Lebanon that blocked access to food and water. Specifically, Ziegler stated that "The government of Israel should be held responsible under international law for the violations of the right to food of the Lebanese civilian population."

Itzhak Levanon, Israel's ambassador to the UN responded that "In all of his reports, Mr. Ziegler always transgresses the limits of his mandate. The latest report – which touches upon several external issues – is no exception." Israel said that Ziegler's report "focused only on the impact of Israeli bombing in Lebanon and did not cover the effects of Hezbollah rocket fire on northern Israel".

Ziegler, according to a pro-Palestinian website, stated on television, "The Israeli occupation is a colonial regime and an illegal military occupation from the UN's point of view, it continues to annex more Palestinian lands; and thus the Israeli occupation is the worst in the history of colonialism."

In 2005, Ziegler likened Gaza to "an immense concentration camp", adding that he was glad the "guards" were about to leave (this was a reference to Israel's unilateral disengagement plan under Ariel Sharon's government). Ziegler later rejected as "absurd and patently false" the suggestion that he had compared Israelis to Nazis, saying that he was actually quoting an Israeli scholar when he made the remark.

=== Interactions with North Korea ===
Ziegler's tomb with a temporary grave cross in October 2026.

Ziegler had several interactions with the government of North Korea while serving as the United Nations Special Rapporteur on the Right to Food. In 2001, he reported that some of the one million tonnes of aid provided by the World Food Programme had been taken by the army, the secret services and the government. In April 2004, a writer in the Asian Wall Street Journal called on North Korea to accept Ziegler's repeated requests for a visit, and to help establish an accountable network for food aid. Later in the same year, Ziegler said that five of his requests to visit North Korea had been turned down by officials in Pyongyang.

== Personal life and death ==
Ziegler was married twice: first to Wedad Zénié, with whom he had a son (playwright Dominique Ziegler) and from whom he was divorced, and subsequently to Erica Deuber Ziegler.

Ziegler died of complications from Parkinson's disease in Geneva on 10 June 2026, at the age of 92. He found his final resting place at the Cimetière des Rois, which is considered the Panthéon of Geneva.

== Criticisms ==
Ziegler's appointment as U.N. Special Rapporteur on the Right to Food was criticized by the American neoconservative political magazineThe Weekly Standard, on the grounds that Ziegler was a sociologist by training and had no particular expertise on food or agriculture. His appointment was also criticized by a group of political figures including Irwin Cotler and Per Ahlmark. This group criticized Ziegler for his associations with figures such as Fidel Castro, his involvement with the Gaddafi Prize, and his support for Roger Garaudy. Their letter opposing Ziegler was issued by the pro-Israel lobbying group UN Watch.

In March 2008, Ileana Ros-Lehtinen, a Cuban-American and the ranking Republican on the U.S. House of Representatives Foreign Affairs Committee, sharply criticized Ziegler's appointment as an advisor to the UN Human Rights Council. Ros-Lehtinen stated:

Mr. Ziegler has drawn criticism for his unyielding support of many of the world's most vicious dictators. He expressed "total support for the Cuban revolution" and its leader, Fidel Castro, whose repressive regime has left hundreds of political dissidents to languish in jail.

Ros-Lehtinen also accused Ziegler of ignoring various famine emergencies and using "his platform to consistently attack America and Israel".

The American Jewish Committee (AJC) opposed Ziegler's bid for re-election to the UN Human Rights Office in 2009. The AJC cited his past support for Roger Garaudy and his criticisms of Israel.

He was also criticized for defending Venezuelan president Maduro in 2017.

== Honors ==
Ziegler was made knight (chevalier) of the French Ordre des Arts et des Lettres in 1994. He had an honorary degree from the University of Mons in Belgium. He was awarded the Medal of the Presidency of the Italian Republic. The Republic of Cape Verde awarded him the National Order of Amílcar Cabral, first degree. He received the Gaddafi Human Rights Prize in 2002.

On 17 January 2009, he received an honorary degree from the University of Paris VIII. He was a member of the advisory board of the left-wing South East European magazine Novi Plamen. In Austria, Ziegler was awarded the "Federal State Salzburg prize for future research" by Federal State Salzburg Governor Gabi Burgstaller on 20 November 2008.

He was honored with ethecon's 2012 "Blue Planet Award" for his "outstanding efforts towards humanitarian ethics".

== Authored works ==
- Sociologie de la nouvelle Afrique ("Sociology of the New Africa"), Gallimard, 1964. ISBN 978-2-07-035059-9
- Sociologie et Contestation, essai sur la société mythique ("Sociology and Contestation"), Gallimard, 1969. ISBN 978-2-07-035192-3
- Le pouvoir africain ("The African Power"), Éditions du Seuil, 1973, new edition 1979. ISBN 978-2-02-005183-5
- Les vivants et la mort ("The Living and the Dead"), Éditions du Seuil, 1973. New edition 1978. ISBN 978-2-02-004796-8
- Une Suisse au-dessus de tout soupçon, 1976. ISBN 978-2-02-004683-1. English-language edition, Switzerland Exposed (translated by R. S. Middleton), Allison & Busby, 1978, ISBN 978-0850312478.
- Main basse sur l'Afrique ("Pillage on Africa"), 1978. New edition 1980. ISBN 978-2-02-005629-8
- Retournez les fusils ! Manuel de sociologie d'opposition ("Turn the Guns Around"), Seuil, 1980. New edition 1991 and again in 2014. ISBN 978-2-02-013102-5
- Vive le pouvoir! Ou les délices de la raison d'état, Éditions du Seuil, 1985. ISBN 978-2-02-008984-5
- La victoire des vaincus, oppression et résistance culturelle ("The Victory of the Defeated"), Éditions du Seuil, 1988. ISBN 978-2-02-013098-1
- La Suisse lave plus blanc ("Swiss Whitewash"), 1990. ISBN 978-2-02-011597-1
- Le bonheur d'être Suisse ("The fortune of being Swiss"), 1994. ISBN 978-2-02-022779-7
- L'Or du Maniema ("The Gold of Maniema"), Éditions du Seuil, 1996. ISBN 978-2-02-028325-0
- Les rebelles, contre l'ordre du monde ("The Rebels, Against World Order"), 1997. ISBN 978-2-02-008614-1
- La Suisse, l'or et les morts ("The Swiss, the Gold, and the Dead"), 1997. ISBN 978-0-14-027858-3
- Les seigneurs du crime : les nouvelles mafias contre la démocratie ("The Crime Lords: the New Mafias against Democracy"), Éditions du Seuil, 1998. ISBN 978-2-02-091429-1
- Le Livre noir du capitalisme ("The Black Book of Capitalism"), co-authored, Temps des Cerises Edition, 1998.
- La faim dans le monde expliquée à mon fils ("World Hunger Explained to my Son"), 1999. ISBN 978-2-02-036753-0
- "UN: Still Hungry to Bed", 2001.
- Les nouveaux maîtres du monde et ceux qui leur résistent ("The new rulers of the world and those who resist them"), 2002. ISBN 978-2-213-61348-2
- Le droit à l'alimentation ("The Right to Adequate food"), Fayard, 2003. ISBN 2-84205-696-5
- L'empire de la honte ("The Empire of Shame"), 2005. ISBN 978-2-253-12115-2
- La haine de l'Occident ("Hate For the West"), 2008. ISBN 978-2-226-18693-5
- Der Aufstand des Gewissens: Die nicht-gehaltene Festspielrede ("The insurrection of the conscience: The non-delivered festival speech"), Salzburg 2011. ISBN 978-3-7110-0016-3
- Destruction massive : Géopolitique de la faim, Éditions du Seuil, 2011. ISBN 978-2-02-106056-0.
- Chemins d'espérance: Ces combats gagnés, parfois perdus mais que nous, Seuil, 2016. ISBN 978-2-02-128878-0Actualités/Essais/Documents
- Le capitalisme expliqué à ma petite-fille (en espérant qu'elle en verra la fin), Seuil, 2018. ISBN 978-2-02-139722-2
- Lesbos, la honte de l'Europe, Éditions du Seuil, 2020. ISBN 978-2-02-145199-3
