= Eric Korpela =

Eric Korpela is a research astronomer at the University of California, Berkeley, He is the director of the SETI@home project, a distributed computing project that was launched in 1999 to use individuals computers to analyze data collected in the Search for Extraterrestrial Intelligence (SETI). Korpela notes that with modern-day mobile devices having greater capacities than personal computers did in 1999, SETI@home has developed an Android app to analyze data gathered by the Breakthrough Listen SETI project.

== Scientific work ==
Korpela is known for his assessment of putative signals from extraterrestrial intelligence. He was skeptical about the claim that 234 signals detected by the Sloan Digital Sky Survey may be from extraterrestrial intelligence, suggesting instead that this may be due to instrumental effects or the method by which the data was analyzed. When a radio signal was detected from the vicinity of the star HD 164595 that some interpreted as a possible signal from extraterrestrial intelligence, Korpela was skeptical, noting "there's really nothing about this 'signal' that would distinguish it from a natural radio transient." Korpela said he was unimpressed by this signal, observing that SETI@home had detected millions of similar signals in the past. He suggested the signal could not be differentiated from signals generated by space-based human technologies, adding "there's also nothing that could distinguish it from a satellite passing through the telescope field of view." In reviewing criteria for a more credible signal from extraterrestrial intelligence than the signal from HD 164595, Korpela said that a credible signal would be detectable from two telescopes on two continents, with the best candidate signals originating from a single point in space. Signals from extraterrestrial intelligence should also be continuous, he suggested.

Looking to future best practices for announcing possible detection of extraterrestrial intelligence, Korpela argued that putative detections should be confirmed by another telescope before being reported to the public. He also advocated the use of the Rio Scale to give "some realism" to possible detections. If a signal is confirmed to be from extraterrestrial intelligence, he advocates not replying without a decision by the world community.

According to Korpela, among the promising targets for future SETI searches are TRAPPIST-1 and Proxima b.

Korpela suggested that extraterrestrial intelligence may be motivated to contact humans because they may have evolved to be curious.

== Most cited papers ==
=== Related to SDETI ===
- DP Anderson, J Cobb, E Korpela, M Lebofski et al. (2002) SETI@ home: an experiment in public-resource computing - Communications of the ACM, 2002 45: p. 56-61. According to Google Scholar, this article has been cited 2001 times
- E Korpela, D Werthimer, D Anderson, J Cobb, M Lebofsky (2001) SETI@ home—massively distributed computing for SETI. Computing in science & engineering 3 (1), 78-83 According to Google Scholar, this article has been cited 629 times
- DP Anderson, E Korpela, R Walton. (2005) High performance task distribution for volunteer computing. First International Conference on e-Science and Grid Computing (e-Science'05 ) According to Google Scholar, this article has been cited 241 times

=== Other topics ===
- JEG Peek, C Heiles, KA Douglas, MY Lee, J Grcevich, S Stanimirović, et al . (2011) The GALFA-HI survey: data release 1. The Astrophysical Journal Supplement Series 194 (2), 20 According to Google Scholar, this article has been cited 176 times
- ME Putman, JEG Peek, A Muratov, OY Gnedin, W Hsu, KA Douglas, et al (2009) The disruption and fueling of M33. The Astrophysical Journal 703 (2), 1486 According to Google Scholar, this article has been cited 115 times
- S Bowyer, TW Berghöfer, EJ Korpela (1999) Extreme-ultraviolet emission in abell 1795, abell 2199, and the coma cluster. The Astrophysical Journal 526 (2), 592 According to Google Scholar, this article has been cited 110 times
