= H. Paul Shuch =

American scientist and engineer (born 1946)

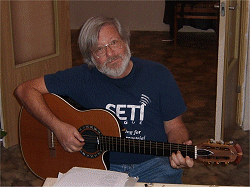
H. Paul Shuch

H. Paul Shuch (born May 23, 1946) is an American scientist and engineer who has coordinated radio amateurs to help in the search for extraterrestrial intelligence (SETI).

Shuch, an aerospace engineer, microwave technologist, and radio amateur call sign N6TX, is believed by colleague Jack Unger to be the creator of the world's first commercial home satellite TV receiver. Recently a visiting professor at Lycoming College and Heidelberg University of Applied Sciences, Shuch continues to volunteer as the Executive Director Emeritus of The SETI League, Inc. He has taught physics, astronomy, and engineering on various university campuses for over four decades. He is also active in science fiction fandom and filk music.

== Early life ==
Born Howard Paul Wakes in Chicago, Illinois, United States, Shuch later adopted the name of his stepfather, physicist Milton L. Shuch (12 Oct 1922–20 Jan 2014).

Shuch earned a Bachelor of Science in industrial technology from San Jose State University and a Doctor of Philosophy (Ph.D.) in engineering from the University of California, Berkeley. Shuch is a Vietnam War-era United States Air Force veteran and active instrument flight instructor. After his military career he worked as an engineer for several Silicon Valley aerospace companies before commencing his academic career. He founded Microcomm Consulting in 1975, where in 1978 he designed and produced a commercial home satellite television receiver.

== SETI activities ==
Shuch first learned about Search for extraterrestrial intelligence (SETI), from Nicholas Marshall, W6OLO, a Hungarian engineer with whom he served on the Board of Project OSCAR, builders of the world's first non-Government satellite. Marshall introduced Shuch to longtime SETI proponent Bernard M. Oliver, then vice-president of Engineering at the Hewlett-Packard Company. Oliver in turn introduced Paul to SETI pioneers Frank Drake and Philip Morrison, who encouraged his continued interest and involvement in the development of SETI radio telescopes, as a spin-off from his design of early satellite TV receivers.

While in graduate school at the University of California, Berkeley, Shuch became acquainted with most of the members of the NASA SETI team in nearby Mountain View. Many SETI pioneers had been affiliated with Berkeley, either as faculty members, students, or postdoctoral researchers, and a SETI-friendly environment (some have called it a 'SETI cabal') persists there. Among Shuch's professors was the prominent radio astronomer William J. "Jack" Welch, a member of the National Academy of Sciences, who further encouraged Shuch's SETI activities. One of Shuch's classmates in Welch's radio telescope design course was Dan Werthimer, who went on to become chief scientist of the SETI@home distributed computing experiment.

When the NASA SETI program was cancelled by the United States Congress in 1993, New Jersey industrialist Richard Factor established the nonprofit, membership-supported SETI League, which he invited Shuch to head. Shuch became the organization's first Executive Director, a position he now holds on an emeritus basis. He designed the hardware and protocols for, and remains Principal Investigator on, the SETI League's Project Argus The SETI League, Inc.: Project Argus all-sky survey.

Shuch is principal investigator for the Invitation to ETI Invitation to ExtraTerrestrial Intelligence, a web-based SETI experiment initiated by his colleague, Allen Tough. Along with Ivan Almar of the Konkoly Observatory, Budapest, Shuch developed the San Marino Scale Wayback Machine, an analytical tool for quantifying the significance of transmissions from Earth into Space.

== Honors and awards ==
- 1999 Fellow of the British Interplanetary Society
- 2007 Full Member of the International Academy of Astronautics
