= Charles Stuart Bowyer =

American astronomer and academic (1934–2020)

Charles Stuart Bowyer (August 2, 1934 – September 23, 2020) was an American astronomer and academic. He was a professor at the University of California.

== Early life and education ==
Bowyer was born in Toledo, Ohio, to Howard and Elizabeth Bowyer. His father was a pilot. As a boy, he attended a one-room grade school near his father’s farm in Orland Park, Ill., before being valedictorian at Orland Park High School. He graduated from Miami University of Ohio with a degree in physics. He received his Ph.D. in physics from Catholic University in 1965.

== Career ==
Bowyer was a professor at University of California at Berkeley. He was also affiliated with the United States Naval Research Laboratory. He worked in a group directed by Herbert Friedman. He is generally given credit for starting the field of extreme ultraviolet astronomy. Bowyer’s pursuit of studying ultraviolet rays was met with resistance at first - astronomers argued that even outside of the Earth's atmosphere most ultraviolet light would get absorbed and be undetectable. However, in 1975 when Bowyer and his team mounted a sensor on Apollo–Soyuz, they were able to detect ultraviolet radiation from white dwarfs and a nova.

He is credited with shepherding the launch of the EUVE satellite and subsequent research activities. The EUVE launched in 1992 and circled Earth for nine years, cataloging about 800 EUV sources in the Milky Way galaxy, before losing operating funds and shutting down in 2001.

Bowyer was also active in the search for extraterrestrial intelligence, or SETI. In 1977, Bowyer started SERENDIP (the Search for Extraterrestrial Radio Emissions From Nearby Developed Intelligent Populations) using an 85-foot telescope at Hat Creek Radio Observatory near Lassen Peak in Northern California. The project was inspired by Project Cyclops, a 1971 NASA report that proposed an international network of radio telescopes to search for intelligent life in the universe. SERENDIP was designed to operate in the background of other astronomers' radio observations. While those observations were happening, it would scan 100 radio frequencies simultaneously in search of extraterrestrial emissions. The project was funded primarily by private donors, including writer and futurist Arthur C. Clarke.

== Death ==
Bowyer died from complications of COVID-19 at an Orinda, California, hospital on September 23, 2020. He was 86.

== Selected works ==
In a statistical overview derived from writings by and about Stuart Bowyer, OCLC/WorldCat encompasses roughly 30+ works in 40+ publications in 3 languages and 1,000+ library holdings.

- X-Ray Astronomy Observational Results, Theoretical Aspects and Experimental Procedures (1970)
- Research in extreme ultraviolet and far ultraviolet astronomy semi-annual status report December 1, 1984 – May 31, 1985 (1985)
- Research in extreme ultraviolet and far ultraviolet astronomy semi-annual status report June 1, 1986 – December 31, 1986 (1986)

== Honors ==
Bowyer received the Humboldt Foundation of Germany Senior Scientist Award in 1982. Other honors and distinctions include the NASA Exceptional Technical Achievement Medal, the NASA Exceptional Scientific Achievement Medal, the Alexander von Humboldt Foundation’s Humboldt Prize, an honorary doctor of science degree from Miami University of Ohio, an honorary doctor of philosophy degree from the Catholic University of America, the NASA Distinguished Public Service Medal, the Computerworld Smithsonian Award and the COSPAR Massey Award.
