= David P. Anderson =

American research scientist (born 1955)

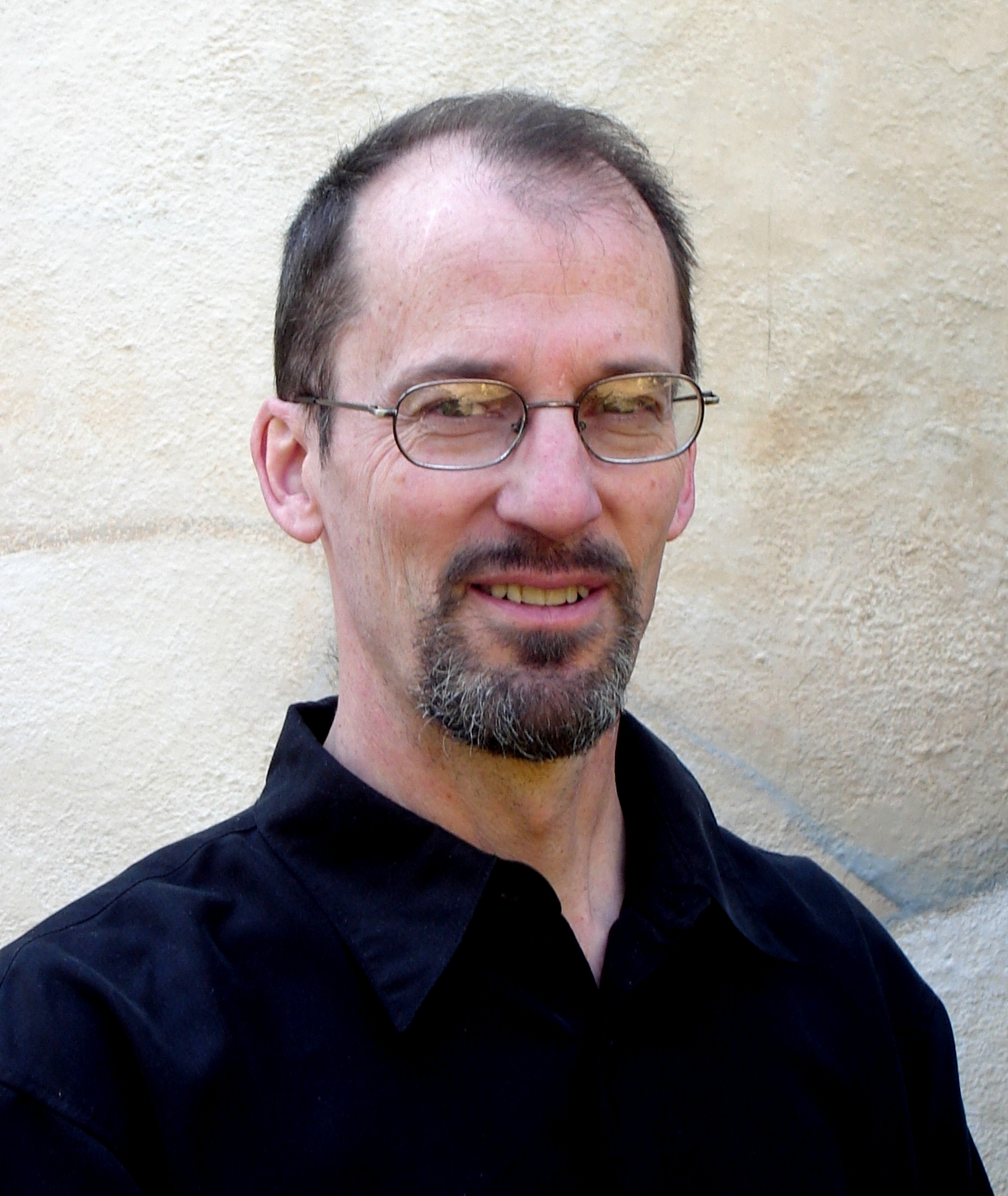
- Born: 1955 (age 70–71); Oakland, California, USA
- Education: Wesleyan University; University of Wisconsin-Madison
- Known for: Volunteer computing
- Awards: NSF Presidential Young Investigator Award; IBM Faculty Development Grant
- Scientific career
- Fields: Computer science
- Workplaces: University of California, Berkeley
- Thesis: A Grammar Based Methodology for Protocol Specification and Implementation (1985)
- Doctoral advisor: Lawrence Landweber

David Pope Anderson (born 1955) is an American research scientist at the Space Sciences Laboratory, at the University of California, Berkeley, and an adjunct professor of computer science at the University of Houston. Anderson leads the SETI@home, BOINC, Bossa, and Bolt software projects.

== Education ==
Anderson received a BA in mathematics from Wesleyan University, and MS and PhD degrees in mathematics and computer science from the University of Wisconsin–Madison. While in graduate school he published four research papers in computer graphics. His PhD research involved using enhanced attribute grammars to specify and implement communication protocols.

== Career ==
From 1985 to 1992 he was an assistant professor in the UC Berkeley Computer Science Department, where he received the NSF Presidential Young Investigator and IBM Faculty Development awards. During this period he conducted several research projects:

- FORMULA (Forth Music Language), a parallel programming language and runtime system for computer music based on Forth.
- MOOD (Musical Object-Oriented Dialect), a parallel programming language and runtime system for computer music based on C++. A port for MS-DOS also exists.
- DASH, a distributed operating system with support for digital audio and video.
- Continuous Media File System (CMFS), a file system for digital audio and video
- Comet, an I/O server for digital audio and video.

From 1992 to 1994 he worked at Sonic Solutions, where he developed Sonic System, the first distributed system for professional digital audio editing.

From 1995 to 1998 he was chief technical officer of Tunes.com, where he developed web-based systems for music discovery based on collaborative filtering, acoustics, and other models.

In 1995 he joined David Gedye and Dan Werthimer in creating SETI@home, an early volunteer computing project. Anderson continues to direct SETI@home.

From 2000 to 2002, he served as CTO of United Devices, a company that developed software for distributed computing.

In 2002 he created the Berkeley Open Infrastructure for Network Computing (BOINC) project, which develops an open-source software platform for volunteer computing. The project is funded by NSF and is based at the UC Berkeley Space Sciences Laboratory. BOINC has been used by about 100 projects, including SETI@home, Einstein@home, Rosetta@home, Climateprediction.net, and the IBM World Community Grid, in areas as diverse as mathematics, medicine, molecular biology, climatology, and astrophysics.

Anderson was involved in Stardust@home, which used 23,000 volunteers to identify interstellar dust particles via the Web – an approach called distributed thinking. In 2007 Anderson developed BOSSA a software framework for distributed thinking, using volunteers on the Internet to perform tasks that require human intelligence, knowledge, or cognitive skills. He also developed BOLT, a framework for web-based training and education in the context of volunteer computing and distributed thinking.

=== Music ===
Since 2020 Anderson has been involved in software projects related to classical music:

- Music Match is a social site where performers and composers can meet and communicate with each other.
- Classical Music Index is an offshoot of IMSLP in which users can rate and review compositions, and can discover compositions likely to appeal to their taste.
- Numula is a Python library for computer rendition of music with complex variations in dynamics, timing, articulation and pedaling, as are typical in human performance.

=== Inventions ===
In 1994 Anderson invented "Virtual Reality Television", a television system allowing viewers to control their virtual position and orientation. He was awarded a patent for this invention in 1996.

In 1994 he developed one of the first systems for collaborative filtering, and developed a web site, rare.com, that provided movie recommendations based on the user's movie ratings.
