= HD 164595 b =

Exoplanet orbiting HD 164595

Discovery
- Discovered by: Courcol et al.
- Discovery date: 10 September 2015
- Detection method: Radial velocity

Orbital characteristics
- Semi-major axis: 0.23 AU (34,000,000 km)
- Eccentricity: 0.0880+0.1200 −0.0660
- Orbital period (sidereal): 40.00±0.24 d
- Star: HD 164595

Physical characteristics
- Mass: 16.14±2.72 M_{🜨}

HD 164595 b is a confirmed exoplanet orbiting around a Sun-like star HD 164595 every 40 days some 94.36 light-years away. It was detected with the radial velocity technique with the SOPHIE echelle spectrograph. The planet has a minimal mass equivalent of 16 Earths.

It is speculated to be a Neptune-like gassy planet incapable of supporting life. The planet has a minimal mass of 16 Earth masses.

== Possible radio signal from star system ==
A recent (2016) radio signal at 11 GHz (2.7 cm wavelength) has been observed from the HD 164595 stellar system. It is unknown which planet of that stellar system is involved, if any. It could instead be gravitational lensing from a more distant source. SETI investigators are looking into it, but the chances of the signal being from an extraterrestrial civilization are considered slim, at best," with SETI researcher Eric Korpela calling it "uninteresting".
