= SEVENDIP =

SEVENDIP, which stands for Search for Extraterrestrial Visible Emissions from Nearby Developed Intelligent Populations and also alludes to serendipity, was a project developed by the Berkeley SETI Research Center at the University of California, Berkeley that used visible wavelengths to search for extraterrestrial life's intelligent signals from outer space.

Between 1997 and 2007, SEVENDIP employed a 30 in (0.76 m) automated telescope located in Lafayette, California, to scan the sky for potential optical interstellar communications in the nanosecond time-scale laser pulses. Another instrument was mounted on Berkeley's 0.8-meter automated telescope at Leuschner Observatory. Their sensors have a rise time of 0.7 ns and are sensitive to 300–700 nm wavelengths (frequencies of 400–1,000 THz).

The target list included mostly nearby F, G, K and M stars, plus a few globular clusters and galaxies. The Leuschner pulse search examined several thousand stars, each for approximately one minute or more.
