= John Billingham =

American physician (1930–2013)

- Born: March 18, 1930; Worcester, England
- Died: August 4, 2013 (aged 83); Grass Valley, California, U.S.
- Education: University College, Oxford (BA, MA); Guy's Hospital (BM BCh)
- Known for: Pioneer of the SETI program Co-organizer of Project Cyclops; Development of spacecraft life-support systems and water-cooled astronaut undergarments
- Awards: NASA Ames Hall of Fame (2009)

Dr. John Billingham, BM BCh, (March 18, 1930 – August 4, 2013) was a British Physician and later director of the SETI Program Office and Director of the Life Sciences Division at the NASA Ames Research Center in the USA. After retiring from NASA he became a Trustee of the SETI Institute Board of Directors.

He was born in Worcester, England in 1930 and educated at the Royal Grammar School Worcester. From there he went on to University College, Oxford to study physiology. He gained a BM BCh degree from Oxford and Guy's Hospital, London (which is equivalent to an M.D. in the US). He served as a medical officer with the Royal Air Force (RAF) for seven years, rising to the rank of Squadron Leader (equivalent to Major in the USAF). In 1963, he was invited to join NASA’s Lyndon B. Johnson Space Center in Houston, Texas, where he headed the Environmental Physiology Branch, and worked on the Mercury, Gemini and Apollo programs.

In 1965 he moved to the NASA Ames Research Center in California, where he headed up the Biotechnology Division, then the Extraterrestrial Research Division, and later the Life Science Division. In 1977 he appeared in the television documentary Mysteries of the Gods hosted by William Shatner to outline the projected search for extraterrestrial life that would later become Project Cyclops.

In 2009 he was inducted into the NASA Ames Hall of Fame where he was recognized for his efforts as the Father of SETI in NASA. After retiring from NASA he joined the SETI Institute as Senior Scientist, and in 1995 he became a Member of the SETI Institute's Board of Trustees, serving a term as Vice-Chair. He was also one of the people behind Project Cyclops.

He died at the age of 83 in Grass Valley, California in August 2013.
