= HD 164595 =

Star in the constellation of Hercules

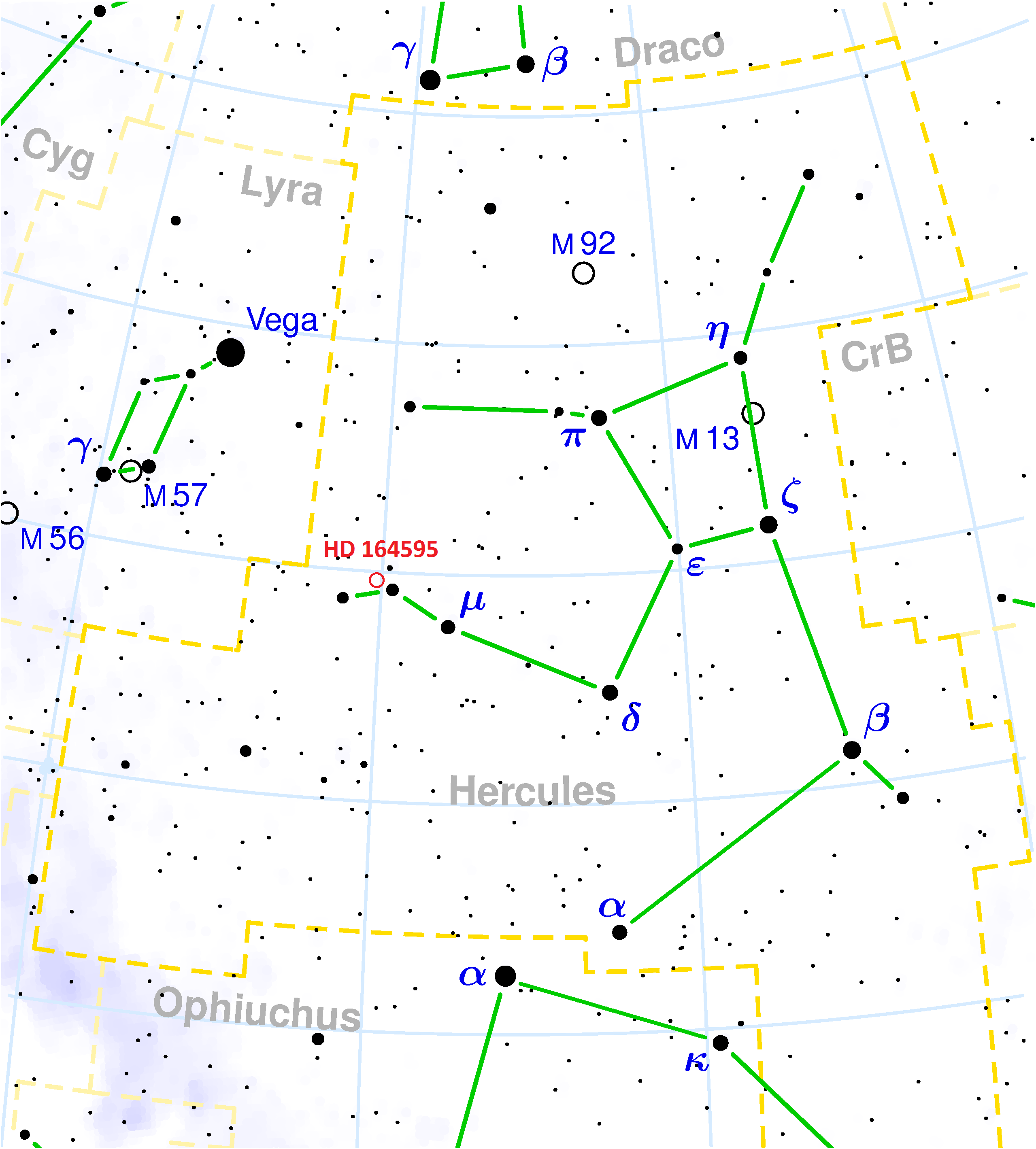
- Position of star HD 164595 in the constellation Hercules

Observation data Epoch J2000 Equinox ICRS
- Constellation: Hercules
- Right ascension: 18^{h} 00^{m} 38.894^{s}
- Declination: +29° 34′ 18.92″
- Apparent magnitude (V): 7.07 + 12.538

Characteristics
- Spectral type: G2 V + M2.5 V
- B−V color index: 0.635±0.005

Astrometry
Radial velocity (R_{v})	2.048±0.0007 km/s
Proper motion (μ)	RA: −138.982 mas/yr Dec.: 173.502 mas/yr
Parallax (π)	35.402±0.0146 mas
Distance	92.13 ± 0.04 ly (28.25 ± 0.01 pc)
Absolute magnitude (M_{V})	+4.81

Details

HD 164595 A (primary)
Mass	1.081±0.054 M_{☉}
Radius	1.057±0.053 R_{☉}
Luminosity	1.023^{+0.049}_{−0.046} L_{☉}
Surface gravity (log g)	4.44±0.05 cgs
Temperature	5,790±40 K
Metallicity [Fe/H]	−0.06 dex
Rotational velocity (v sin i)	0.1 km/s
Age	4.5 Gyr

HD 164595 B (secondary)
Mass	0.455±0.046 M_{☉}
Radius	0.464±0.018 R_{☉}
Temperature	3,648±21 K
Rotation	43.486848 d

Other designations
- BD+29 3165, HD 164595, HIP 88194, SAO 85632, PPM 106642, WDS J18006+2934, TYC 2103-1620-1, 2MASS J18003890+2934188

Database references
SIMBAD	data

HD 164595 is a wide binary star system in the northern constellation of Hercules. The primary component of this pair hosts an orbiting exoplanet. The system is located at a distance of 92 light years from the Sun based on parallax measurements, and is drifting further away with a radial velocity of 2.0 km/s. Although it has an absolute magnitude of +4.81, at that distance it is too faint to be viewed with the naked eye, having an apparent visual magnitude of 7.07. The brighter star can be found with binoculars or a small telescope less than a degree to the east-northeast of Xi Herculis. HD 164595 has a relatively large proper motion, traversing the celestial sphere at an angular rate of 0.222″ yr^{−1}.

The spectrum of the primary, component A, presents as a G-type main-sequence star with a stellar classification of G2 V. It is considered an excellent solar twin candidate, although it has a lower logarithm of metallicity ratio, at −0.06 compared with 0.00. (Note: An exact solar twin would be a G2V star with a 5778 K temperature, be 4.6 billion years old, with the correct metallicity and a 0.1% solar luminosity variation.) The estimated mass, radius, and luminosity of this star are all similar to the Sun, and the level of magnetic activity in the chromosphere is comparable to solar levels.

The secondary member, component B, is a magnitude 12.5 star at a projected separation of 2,509±27 AU from the primary. It is a small red dwarf of spectral class M2.5 V. Periodic variations in the light curve of this star suggest a rotation period of 43.5 days.

== Planetary system ==
HD 164595 has one known exoplanet, HD 164595 b, which orbits HD 164595 A every 40 days. It was detected with the radial velocity technique with the SOPHIE echelle spectrograph. Since the inclination of the orbital plane is unknown, only a lower bound on the mass of the object can be determined. The exoplanet has a minimal mass equivalent of 16 Earths.

The HD 164595 A planetary system
Companion (in order from star)	Mass	Semimajor axis (AU)	Orbital period (days)	Eccentricity	Inclination (°)	Radius
b	>0.0516±0.00856 M_{J}	0.23	40.00±0.24	0.088^{+0.12}_{−0.066}	—	—

== Signal observation and SETI ==
In 2016, HD 164595 briefly attracted media attention after it was reported that a possible SETI signal had been detected from the direction of the star in the previous year. The signal was only heard once and never confirmed by other telescopes, and is thought to have been due to terrestrial interference.

On 15 May 2015, a brief, single radio signal at 11 GHz (2.7 cm wavelength) was observed in the direction of HD 164595 by a team led by N. N. Bursov involving Claudio Maccone at the RATAN-600 radio observatory. The signal may have been caused by terrestrial radio-frequency interference or gravitational lensing from a more distant source. It was observed only once (for two seconds), by a single team, at a single telescope, giving it a Rio Scale score of 1 (insignificant) or 2 (low). Discussions in the media from 29 August 2016 onwards featured speculation that the signal could be caused by an isotropic beacon from a Type II civilization.

The senior astronomer of the SETI Institute, Seth Shostak, stated that confirmation by another telescope is required. Astronomer Nicholas Suntzeff of Texas A&M University stated that the signal is in a military frequency band, and that it could have been a satellite downlink, implying that some such systems may be kept secret and therefore would be unknown to SETI scientists.

SETI and METI studies followed with the Allen Telescope Array and the Boquete Optical SETI Observatory. Also, scientists at Berkeley SETI Research Center at the University of California, Berkeley observed HD 164595 using the Green Bank Telescope as part of the Breakthrough Listen program. No signal was detected at the position and frequency of the transient reported by the RATAN group.

The Special Astrophysical Observatory of the Russian Academy of Sciences has since released an official statement that the signal is of a "most probable terrestrial origin".

== See also ==
- Arecibo message, a three-minute-long message sent into space
- HD 162826
- Tabby's Star (KIC 8462852)
- Wow! signal, possible alien radio signal
