= Dan Werthimer =

American astronomer

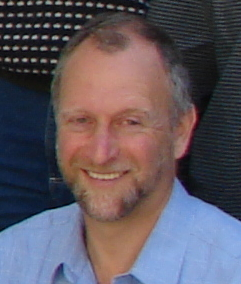
- Education: San Francisco State University, B.A. University of California Berkeley
- Known for: Search for Extra-Terrestrial Intelligence
- Awards: Carl Sagan Prize for Science Popularization (2019); Drake Award (2021)
- Scientific career
- Fields: Astrophysics, Electrical Engineering and Computer Science
- Workplaces: University of California, Berkeley; Space Sciences Laboratory

Dan Werthimer is co-founder and chief scientist of the SETI@home project and directs other UC Berkeley SETI searches at radio, infrared and visible wavelengths, including the Search for Extra-Terrestrial Radio Emissions from Nearby Developed Intelligent Populations (SERENDIP). He is also the principal investigator for the worldwide Collaboration for Astronomy Signal Processing and Electronics Research (CASPER).

Werthimer was associate professor in the engineering and physics departments of San Francisco State University and a visiting professor at Beijing Normal University, the University of St. Charles in Marseille, Eotvos University in Budapest. His father, Jerrold Werthimer, was Professor of Journalism at San Francisco State University for many years.

Werthimer has taught courses at universities in Peru, Egypt, Ghana, Ethiopia, Zimbabwe, Uganda and Kenya. He has published numerous papers in the fields of SETI, radio astronomy, instrumentation and science education; he is co-author of "SETI 2020" and editor of "Astronomical and Biochemical Origins and the Search for Life in the Universe". He received the prestigious Frank Drake Prize of the SETI Institute in 2021.
