= Allen Tough =

Canadian educator and researcher

Allen Tough (January 6, 1936 – 27 April, 2012) was a Canadian educator and researcher. Widely known as a futurist, scientist, and author, Tough was Professor Emeritus at the University of Toronto at the time of his death. He made major contributions to the fields of Adult Education, Futures Studies, and SETI. Linking these fields together was Tough's concern with the long-term future of humanity in the cosmos, and human kind's search for meaning and purpose on personal, societal, and global levels. He taught at the Ontario Institute for Studies in Education (OISE), University of Toronto, for 33 years, retiring from teaching in 1997. After his retirement he devoted his time and energy to his research interests.

== Education and early research ==
Allen Tough was born and raised in Toronto, Ontario, Canada. During his years as a student at the University of Toronto, Tough's interests included psychology, sociology, philosophy, global issues, alternative futures, journalism, youth and adult education, as well as soccer, skating, dancing, campus publications, and wilderness hiking. He served as Editor-in-Chief of the all-campus yearbook for two years, recruiting and supervising a staff of 40 volunteers.

During his twenties, Tough taught high-school English and Guidance for two years, earned his M.A. at the University of Toronto, married and began his family, earned his Ph.D. at the University of Chicago, and became an assistant professor at the University of Toronto. In Chicago, in line with his focus on the psychology of adult learning and change, he did a Ph.D. internship in conference planning and wrote his Ph.D. thesis on the behavior of adults during self-directed learning projects.

Until the end of the 1970s, Tough's line of research focused on the adult's successful efforts to learn and change, particularly the 70% of adults who are self-guided without relying much on professionals or institutions. His first books, The Adult's Learning Projects and Intentional Changes, were based on his thesis research.

== Adult learning ==
For more than four decades Tough was globally recognized as a pioneering scholar in adult learning, self-directed growth, and personal change. His contributions to the field date from the 1960s, and his research illuminated adults' successful efforts to learn and change. More than 90 major studies in eleven countries were based on Tough's early work.

Tough's inquiry contributed to an expansion of the dialogue on adult learning to include self-directed learning. He was instrumental in catalyzing movement from research focused primarily on who participates in organized adult education, to one which embraces the entire range of intentional adult learning.

Allen Tough wrote seven books and numerous articles and papers over the span of his career. His book The Adult's Learning Projects was chosen as one of the ten classical books in adult education. He was named "one of six most often used authors" in a survey of the Adult Education Association in 1978. He received The Malcolm Knowles Memorial Award for significant lifelong contribution to the field of self-directed learning in 2006. Later the same year, he was inducted into the International Adult and Continuing Education Hall of Fame in Dallas, Texas.

== Future studies and SETI ==
In 1981 Tough expanded his areas of study to include the fields of Futures Studies and the search for extraterrestrial intelligence, or SETI. His 1991 book Crucial Questions about the Future, which united these themes, was translated into Spanish and Chinese. Throughout the 1980s and 1990s, Tough continued to pursue these subjects, both through publishing and presenting papers at European SETI conferences, SETI League symposiums, and the World Space Congress. His book When SETI Succeeds was chosen as one of eight works "The Editors Recommend" in the December 2000 issue of Scientific American. He coordinated the World Future Society's Web forum on future generations, and was recognized as a Fellow of the World Futures Studies Federation and the British Interplanetary Society.

== The SETI League ==
Tough was a SETI League Charter Member, edited the online academic journal Contact in Context, initiated that journal's Best Ideas Awards, was founding chair of the SETI League's Strategic Planning Committee, and served as a SETI League volunteer Regional Coordinator. The SETI League honored him in 2003 with its Orville Greene Service Award.

== Invitation to ETI ==
Almost everyone who thinks and writes about the search for extraterrestrial intelligence agrees that the technology of any civilization we detect will be thousands or even millions of years beyond Earth's. In his 1986 and 1987 SETI papers, Tough had discussed the likelihood that such a civilization can (one way or another) reach or study the Solar System. In November 1994 he began to focus more intensively on such a possibility. One year later, at the Boston Museum of Science, he devoted his Wright Lecture on Cosmic Evolution to this topic, specifically to the feasibility of a small smart interstellar probe reaching our planet. During 1996, at SETI and Contact conferences in California, Capri, and Beijing, he presented papers that furthered this topic. A year later he incorporated these papers into a foundation paper on small smart interstellar probes for the Journal of the British Interplanetary Society.

Throughout 1995 and early 1996, Tough pondered how to detect extraterrestrial intelligence if it had, in fact, reached Earth. In June 1996 he came up with a promising approach - he realized that the World Wide Web enabled a new search strategy. It was now possible to switch from detecting to inviting. Instead of figuring out how to detect extraterrestrial intelligence, humans could simply use the Web to invite contact.

The logic of this idea is simple. As Tough read and thought about the long-term future of human civilization and technology, he realized that a highly advanced civilization or intelligence would likely be able to study our civilization in detail. Humans will likely achieve a similar capability within 200 years, and NASA is already trying to design an interstellar probe; such feats should be easy for an intelligence and technology thousands of years older than we are. Tough realized that a highly advanced intelligence could learn our languages and learn about our civilization in great detail. In particular, it could monitor our television broadcasts, our fax and email communications (as some of our human security agencies do already), and of course our World Wide Web and its search engines and directories. As a result of this insight, Dr. Tough drafted an online "Invitation to ETI." In 2000, he published an essay, How to Achieve Contact: Five Promising Strategies.

In the early stages of this effort to contact ETI (in whatever form it has reached our solar system), about 20 individuals were listed as an informal advisory panel. On October 27, 1998, a much larger group issued the Invitation to ETI, with Allen Tough serving as coordinator. This continuing group now includes 100 Signatories, most of them scientists and artists who are active in the SETI field, the interstellar propulsion field, studies of the future, or the annual CONTACT conference.

== International Academy of Astronautics ==
Tough was a Full Member of the International Academy of Astronautics and a leader within the academy's SETI Committee. In 2006 he initiated The Billingham Cutting-Edge Lectures, a series of annual lectures to be held at the meetings of the International Academy of Astronautics SETI Permanent Study Group.

== Illness and death ==
In 2000 Tough began exhibiting symptoms of multiple system atrophy, a degenerative neurological disorder initially misdiagnosed as Parkinson's Disease. In January 2008, at the age of 72, he said about his health: "I have always enjoyed walking and hiking, and enjoyed good health until recently. Then one day in the summer of 2000, while my wife Cathy and I were hiking in Kluane National Park in the Yukon, I had problems with balance and falling. At the time, I attributed it to fatigue. Now I know it was the first warning sign of a disease called multiple system atrophy, a rare degenerative disease related to Parkinson's. It occurs because of progressive cell loss in numerous sites in the central nervous system. Why this cell loss occurs is unknown. Because MSA causes postural instability and low blood pressure, I always use a walker. I continue to live a happy, busy, productive life. I feel cheerful and not at all sick. Cathy and I often enjoy walking in natural settings. Life is good!"

For the remainder of his life, Tough continued to make significant intellectual contributions to his three chosen fields of research: adult learning, futures studies, and the Search for ExtraTerrestrial Intelligence. During the last few days of his life, despite having lost the ability to communicate verbally, he was actively involved in the analysis of a still unverified SETI candidate detection. Allen Tough died of pneumonia on 27 April 2012, at the age of 76.

== Selected publications ==
- Tough, A. (1999). Data page for "Reflections on the study of adult learning". Centre for the Study of Education and Work, Research Repository, Ontario Institute for Studies in Education, University of Toronto. WALL Working Paper 8.
- Tough, A. (1967). Learning without a teacher: A study of tasks and assistance during adult self-teaching. Toronto: Ontario Institute for Studies in Education.
