= SHGb02+14a =

Astronomical radio source discovered by the SETI@home project (March 2003)

SHGb02+14a is an astronomical radio source and a candidate in the Search for Extra-Terrestrial Intelligence (SETI), discovered in March 2003 by SETI@home and announced in New Scientist on September 1, 2004.

== Observation ==
The source was originally detected by Oliver Voelker of Logpoint in Nuremberg, Germany and Nate Collins of Farin and Associates in Wisconsin, USA using the giant Arecibo Telescope in Puerto Rico. It was observed three times (for a total of about one minute) at a frequency of about 1420 MHz, one of the frequencies in the waterhole region, which is theorized to be a good candidate for frequencies used by extraterrestrial intelligence to broadcast contact signals.

There are a number of puzzling features of this candidate, which have led to a large amount of skepticism. The source is located between the constellations Pisces and Aries, a direction in which no stars are observed within 1000 light years from Earth. It is also a very weak signal. The frequency of the signal has a rapid drift, changing by between 8 and 37 hertz per second. If the cause is Doppler shift, it would indicate emission from a planet rotating nearly 40 times faster on its axis than the Earth. Each time the signal was detected, it was again at about 1420 MHz, the original frequency before any drift.

There are a number of potential explanations for this signal. SETI@home has denied media reports of a likely extraterrestrial intelligence signal. It could be an artifact of random chance, cosmic noise or even a glitch in the technology.

=== Star field ===
The region is unusually devoid of any nearby stars. The closest star systems in the approximate region of the signal include the binary star G 73-11A and B, which are 106.1 light-years from the Sun, although the unrelated star G 73-10 is only 108.7 light-years away, less than three light-years from G 73-11A and B. All of these stars are red dwarfs, which are much less massive than the Sun. The much nearer star, L 1159-16, which is one of the nearest 40 stars to the Sun, is near the signal's position, but its proximity is likely coincidental.

== See also ==
- BLC1
- Wow! signal
