= Isotropic beacon =

Hypothetical type of transmission beacon

An isotropic beacon is a hypothetical type of transmission beacon that emits a uniform EM signal in all directions for the purposes of communication with extraterrestrial intelligence.

== Isotropic beacons and their relation to SETI ==
An isotropic beacon can be any transmitter that emits a uniform electromagnetic field. However, the term is most commonly used to describe a transmitter used by a civilization to call attention to itself over interstellar distances to extraterrestrial creatures. The isotropic beacon uses the Kardashev scale. The Kardashev scale is a method of measuring a civilization's level of technological advancement based on the amount of energy it is able to use. The measure was proposed by Soviet astronomer Nikolai Kardashev in 1964. The Kardashev scale has three designated categories, which are a Type I civilization, also called a planetary civilization, that can use and store all of the energy available on its planet. A Type II civilization, also called a stellar civilization, can use and control energy at the scale of its planetary system. A Type III civilization, also called a galactic civilization, can control energy at the scale of its entire host galaxy. Project Cyclops is and was one of the first looks at the theoretical framework of what it would take to create such a device.
