= Search for extraterrestrial intelligence =

Effort to find civilizations not from Earth

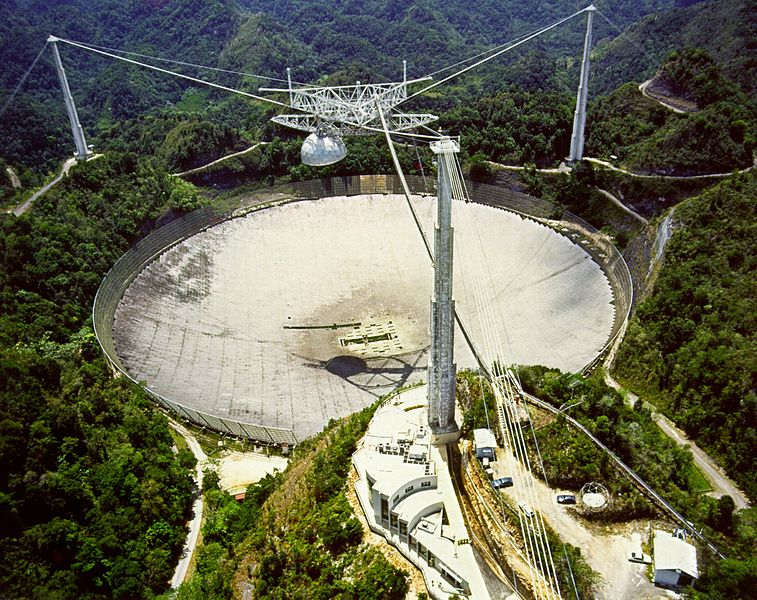
Arecibo Telescope in Puerto Rico with its 300 m (980 ft) dish was one of the world's largest filled-aperture (i.e., full dish) radio telescopes and conducted some SETI searches.

The search for extraterrestrial intelligence (usually shortened as SETI) is the diverse efforts and scientific projects intended to detect extraterrestrial signals, or any evidence of intelligent life beyond Earth.

Researchers use methods such as monitoring electromagnetic radiation, searching for optical signals, and investigating potential extraterrestrial artifacts for any signs of transmission from civilizations present on other planets. Some initiatives have also attempted to send messages to hypothetical alien civilizations, such as NASA's Golden Record.

Modern SETI research began in the early 20th century after the advent of radio, expanding with projects like Project Ozma, the Wow! signal detection, and the Breakthrough Listen initiative; a $100 million, 10-year attempt to detect signals from nearby stars, announced in 2015 by Stephen Hawking and Yuri Milner. Since the 1980s, international efforts have been ongoing, with community led projects such as SETI@home and Project Argus, engaging in analyzing data. While SETI remains a respected scientific field, it often gets compared to conspiracy theory, UFO research, bringing unwarranted skepticism from the public, despite its reliance on rigorous scientific methods and verifiable data and research. Similar studies on unidentified aerial phenomena (UAP) such as Avi Loeb's Galileo Project have brought further attention to SETI research.

Despite decades of searching, no confirmed evidence of alien intelligence has been found, bringing criticism onto SETI for being 'overly hopeful'. Critics argue that SETI is speculative and unfalsifiable, while supporters see it as a crucial step in addressing the Fermi paradox and understanding extraterrestrial technosignature.

== History ==
=== Early work ===
There have been many earlier searches for extraterrestrial intelligence within the Solar System. In 1896, Nikola Tesla suggested that an extreme version of his wireless electrical transmission system could be used to contact beings on Mars. In 1899, while conducting experiments at his Colorado Springs experimental station, he thought he had detected a signal from Mars since an odd repetitive static signal seemed to cut off when Mars set in the night sky. Analysis of Tesla's research has led to a range of explanations including:

- Tesla simply misunderstood the new technology he was working with,
- that he may have been observing signals from Marconi's European radio experiments,
- and even speculation that he could have picked up naturally occurring radio noise caused by a moon of Jupiter (Io) moving through the magnetosphere of Jupiter.

In the early 1900s, Guglielmo Marconi, Lord Kelvin and David Peck Todd also stated their belief that radio could be used to contact Martians, with Marconi stating that his stations had also picked up potential Martian signals.

On August 21–23, 1924, Mars entered an opposition closer to Earth than at any time in the century before or the next 80 years. In the United States, a "National Radio Silence Day" was promoted during a 36-hour period from August 21–23, with all radios quiet for five minutes on the hour, every hour. At the United States Naval Observatory, a radio receiver was lifted 3 kilometres (1.9 miles) above the ground in a dirigible tuned to a wavelength between 8 and 9 km, using a "radio-camera" developed by Amherst College and Charles Francis Jenkins. The program was led by David Peck Todd with the military assistance of Admiral Edward W. Eberle (Chief of Naval Operations), with William F. Friedman (chief cryptographer of the United States Army), assigned to translate any potential Martian messages.

A 1959 paper by Philip Morrison and Giuseppe Cocconi first pointed out the possibility of searching the microwave spectrum. It proposed frequencies and a set of initial targets.

In 1960, Cornell University astronomer Frank Drake performed the first modern SETI experiment, named "Project Ozma" after the Queen of Oz in L. Frank Baum's fantasy books. Drake used a radio telescope 26 metres (85 ft) in diameter at Green Bank, West Virginia, to examine the stars Tau Ceti and Epsilon Eridani near the 1.420 gigahertz marker frequency, a region of the radio spectrum dubbed the "water hole" due to its proximity to the hydrogen and hydroxyl radical spectral lines. A 400 kilohertz band around the marker frequency was scanned using a single-channel receiver with a bandwidth of 100 hertz. He found nothing of interest.

Soviet scientists took a strong interest in SETI during the 1960s and performed a number of searches with omnidirectional antennas in the hope of picking up powerful radio signals. Soviet astronomer Iosif Shklovsky wrote the pioneering book in the field, Universe, Life, Intelligence (1962), which was expanded upon by American astronomer Carl Sagan as the best-selling book Intelligent Life in the Universe (1966).

In the March 1955 issue of Scientific American, John D. Kraus described an idea to scan the cosmos for natural radio signals using a flat-plane radio telescope equipped with a parabolic reflector. Within two years, his concept was approved for construction by Ohio State University. With a total of US$71,000 (equivalent to $813,892 in 2025) in grants from the National Science Foundation, construction began on an 8-hectare (20-acre) plot in Delaware, Ohio. This Ohio State University Radio Observatory telescope was called "Big Ear". Later, it began the world's first continuous SETI program, called the Ohio State University SETI program.

In 1971, NASA funded a SETI study that involved Drake, Barney Oliver of Hewlett-Packard Laboratories, and others. The resulting report proposed the construction of an Earth-based radio telescope array with 1,500 dishes known as "Project Cyclops". The price tag for the Cyclops array was US$10 billion. Cyclops was not built, but the report formed the basis of much SETI work that followed.

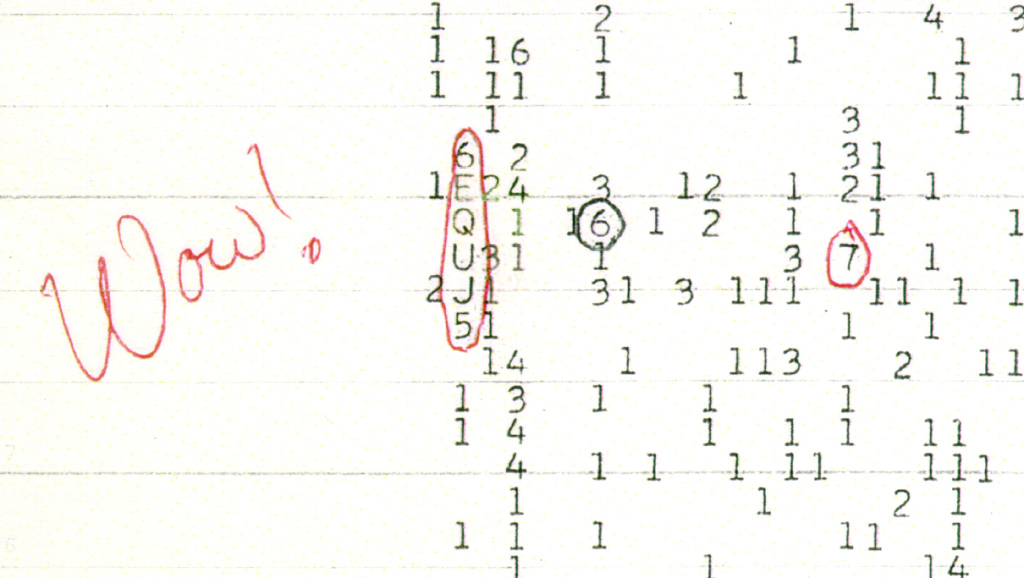
The Wow! Signal

The Ohio State SETI program gained fame on August 15, 1977, when Jerry Ehman, a project volunteer, witnessed a startlingly strong signal received by the telescope. He quickly circled the indication on a printout and scribbled the exclamation "Wow!" in the margin. Dubbed the Wow! signal, it is considered by some to be the best candidate for a radio signal from an artificial, extraterrestrial source ever discovered, but it has not been detected again in several additional searches.

On 24 May 2023, a test extraterrestrial signal, in the form of a "coded radio signal from Mars", was transmitted to radio telescopes on Earth, according to a report in The New York Times.

=== Sentinel, META, and BETA ===
In 1980, Carl Sagan, Bruce Murray, and Louis Friedman founded the U.S. Planetary Society, partly as a vehicle for SETI studies.

In the early 1980s, Harvard University physicist Paul Horowitz took the next step and proposed the design of a spectrum analyzer specifically intended to search for SETI transmissions. Traditional desktop spectrum analyzers were of little use for this job, as they sampled frequencies using banks of analog filters and so were restricted in the number of channels they could acquire. However, modern integrated-circuit digital signal processing (DSP) technology could be used to build autocorrelation receivers to check far more channels. This work led in 1981 to a portable spectrum analyzer named "Suitcase SETI" that had a capacity of 131,000 narrow band channels. After field tests that lasted into 1982, Suitcase SETI was put into use in 1983 with the 26-meter (85 ft) Harvard/Smithsonian radio telescope at Oak Ridge Observatory in Harvard, Massachusetts. This project was named "Sentinel" and continued into 1985.

Even 131,000 channels were not enough to search the sky in detail at a fast rate, so Suitcase SETI was followed in 1985 by Project "META", for "Megachannel Extra-Terrestrial Assay". The META spectrum analyzer had a capacity of 8.4 million channels and a channel resolution of 0.05 hertz. An important feature of META was its use of frequency Doppler shift to distinguish between signals of terrestrial and extraterrestrial origin. The project was led by Horowitz with the help of the Planetary Society, and was partly funded by movie maker Steven Spielberg. A second such effort, META II, was begun in Argentina in 1990, to search the southern sky, receiving an equipment upgrade in 1996–1997.

The follow-on to META was named "BETA", for "Billion-channel Extraterrestrial Assay", and it commenced observation on October 30, 1995. The heart of BETA's processing capability consisted of 63 dedicated fast Fourier transform (FFT) engines, each capable of performing a 2^{22}-point complex FFTs in two seconds, and 21 general-purpose personal computers equipped with custom digital signal processing boards. This allowed BETA to receive 250 million simultaneous channels with a resolution of 0.5 hertz per channel. It scanned through the microwave spectrum from 1.400 to 1.720 gigahertz in eight hops, with two seconds of observation per hop. An important capability of the BETA search was rapid and automatic re-observation of candidate signals, achieved by observing the sky with two adjacent beams, one slightly to the east and the other slightly to the west. A successful candidate signal would first transit the east beam, and then the west beam and do so with a speed consistent with Earth's sidereal rotation rate. A third receiver observed the horizon to veto signals of obvious terrestrial origin. On March 23, 1999, the 26-meter radio telescope on which Sentinel, META and BETA were based was blown over by strong winds and seriously damaged. This forced the BETA project to cease operation.

=== MOP and Project Phoenix ===
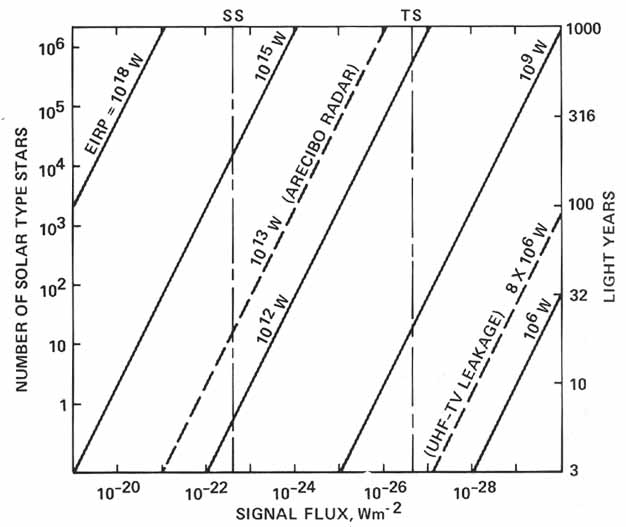
Sensitivity vs range for SETI radio searches. The diagonal lines show transmitters of different effective powers. The x-axis is the sensitivity of the search. The y-axis on the right is the range in light-years, and on the left is the number of Sun-like stars within this range. The vertical line labeled SS is the typical sensitivity achieved by a full sky search, such as BETA above. The vertical line labeled TS is the typical sensitivity achieved by a targeted search such as Phoenix.

In 1978, the NASA SETI program had been heavily criticized by Senator William Proxmire, and funding for SETI research was removed from the NASA budget by Congress in 1981; however, funding was restored in 1982, after Carl Sagan talked with Proxmire and convinced him of the program's value. In 1992, the U.S. government funded an operational SETI program, in the form of the NASA Microwave Observing Program (MOP). MOP was planned as a long-term effort to conduct a general survey of the sky and also carry out targeted searches of 800 specific nearby stars. MOP was to be performed by radio antennas associated with the NASA Deep Space Network, as well as the 140-foot (43 m) radio telescope of the National Radio Astronomy Observatory at Green Bank, West Virginia and the 1,000-foot (300 m) radio telescope at the Arecibo Observatory in Puerto Rico. The signals were to be analyzed by spectrum analyzers, each with a capacity of 15 million channels. These spectrum analyzers could be grouped together to obtain greater capacity. Those used in the targeted search had a bandwidth of 1 hertz per channel, while those used in the sky survey had a bandwidth of 30 hertz per channel.

MOP drew the attention of the United States Congress, where the program met opposition and canceled one year after its start. SETI advocates continued without government funding, and in 1995 the nonprofit SETI Institute of Mountain View, California resurrected the MOP program under the name of Project "Phoenix", backed by private sources of funding. In 2012 it cost around $2 million per year to maintain SETI research at the SETI Institute and around 10 times that to support different SETI activities globally. Project Phoenix, under the direction of Jill Tarter, was a continuation of the targeted search program from MOP and studied roughly 1,000 nearby Sun-like stars until approximately 2015. From 1995 through March 2004, Phoenix conducted observations at the 64-meter (210 ft) Parkes radio telescope in Australia, the 140-foot (43 m) radio telescope of the National Radio Astronomy Observatory in Green Bank, West Virginia, and the 1,000-foot (300 m) radio telescope at the Arecibo Observatory in Puerto Rico. The project observed the equivalent of 800 stars over the available channels in the frequency range from 1200 to 3000 MHz. The search was sensitive enough to pick up transmitters with 1 GW EIRP to a distance of about 200 light-years.

== Ongoing radio searches ==
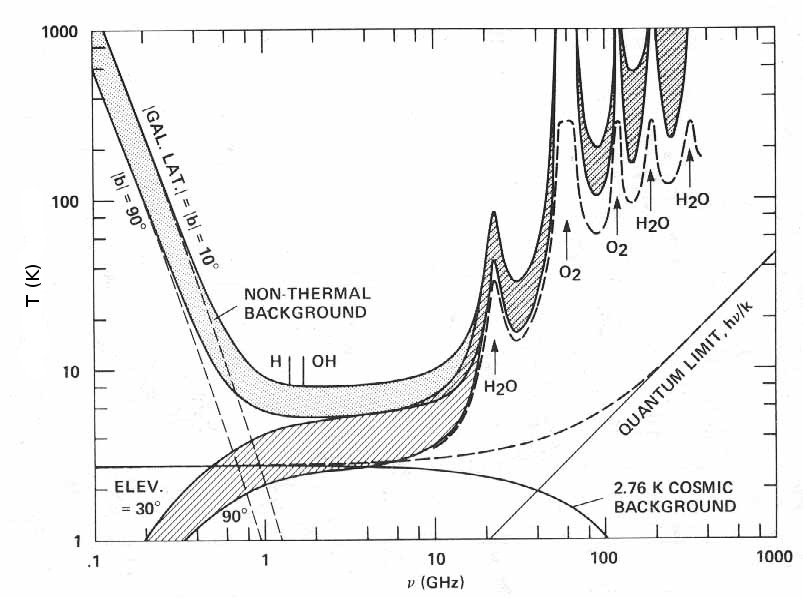
Microwave window as seen by a ground based system. From NASA report SP-419: SETI – the Search for Extraterrestrial Intelligence

Many radio frequencies penetrate Earth's atmosphere quite well, and this led to radio telescopes that investigate the cosmos using large radio antennas. Furthermore, human endeavors emit considerable electromagnetic radiation as a byproduct of communications such as television and radio. These signals would be easy to recognize as artificial due to their repetitive nature and narrow bandwidths. Earth has been sending radio waves from broadcasts into space for over 100 years. These signals have reached over 1,000 stars, most notably Vega, Aldebaran, Barnard's Star, Sirius, and Proxima Centauri. If intelligent alien life exists on any planet orbiting these nearby stars, these signals could be heard and deciphered, even though some of the signal is garbled by the Earth's ionosphere.

Many international radio telescopes are currently being used for radio SETI searches, including the Low Frequency Array (LOFAR) in Europe, the Murchison Widefield Array (MWA) in Australia, and the Lovell Telescope in the United Kingdom.

=== Allen Telescope Array ===
The SETI Institute collaborated with the Radio Astronomy Laboratory at the Berkeley SETI Research Center to develop a specialized radio telescope array for SETI studies, similar to a mini-cyclops array. Formerly known as the One Hectare Telescope (1HT), the concept was renamed the "Allen Telescope Array" (ATA) after the project's benefactor, Paul Allen. Its sensitivity is designed to be equivalent to a single large dish more than 100 meters in diameter, if fully completed. Presently, the array has 42 operational dishes at the Hat Creek Radio Observatory in rural northern California.

The full array (ATA-350) is planned to consist of 350 or more offset-Gregorian radio dishes, each 6.1 meters (20 feet) in diameter. These dishes are the largest producible with commercially available satellite television dish technology. The ATA was planned for a 2007 completion date, at a cost of US$25 million. The SETI Institute provided money for building the ATA while University of California, Berkeley designed the telescope and provided operational funding. The first portion of the array (ATA-42) became operational in October 2007 with 42 antennas. The DSP system planned for ATA-350 is extremely ambitious. Completion of the full 350 element array will depend on funding and the technical results from ATA-42.

ATA-42 (ATA) is designed to allow multiple observers simultaneous access to the interferometer output at the same time. Typically, the ATA snapshot imager (used for astronomical surveys and SETI) is run in parallel with a beamforming system (used primarily for SETI). ATA also supports observations in multiple synthesized pencil beams at once, through a technique known as "multibeaming". Multibeaming provides an effective filter for identifying false positives in SETI, since a very distant transmitter must appear at only one point on the sky.

SETI Institute's Center for SETI Research (CSR) uses ATA in the search for extraterrestrial intelligence, observing 12 hours a day, 7 days a week. From 2007 to 2015, ATA identified hundreds of millions of technological signals. So far, all these signals have been assigned the status of noise or radio frequency interference because a) they appear to be generated by satellites or Earth-based transmitters, or b) they disappeared before the threshold time limit of ~1 hour. Researchers in CSR are working on ways to reduce the threshold time limit, and to expand ATA's capabilities for detection of signals that may have embedded messages.

Berkeley astronomers used the ATA to pursue several science topics, some of which might have transient SETI signals, until 2011, when the collaboration between the University of California, Berkeley and the SETI Institute was terminated.

CNET published an article and pictures about the Allen Telescope Array (ATA) on December 12, 2008.

In April 2011, the ATA entered an 8-month "hibernation" due to funding shortfalls. Regular operation of the ATA resumed on December 5, 2011.

In 2012, the ATA was revitalized with a $3.6 million donation by Franklin Antonio, co-founder and Chief Scientist of QUALCOMM Incorporated. This gift supported upgrades of all the receivers on the ATA dishes to have (2× to 10× over the range 1–8 GHz) greater sensitivity than before and supporting observations over a wider frequency range from 1–18 GHz, though initially the radio frequency electronics only go to 12 GHz. As of July 2013, the first of these receivers was installed and proven, with full installation on all 42 antennas being expected for June 2017. ATA is well suited to the search for extraterrestrial intelligence (SETI) and to discovery of astronomical radio sources, such as heretofore unexplained non-repeating, possibly extragalactic, pulses known as fast radio bursts or FRBs.

=== SERENDIP ===
SERENDIP (Search for Extraterrestrial Radio Emissions from Nearby Developed Intelligent Populations) is a SETI program launched in 1979 by the Berkeley SETI Research Center. SERENDIP takes advantage of ongoing "mainstream" radio telescope observations as a "piggy-back" or "commensal" program, using large radio telescopes including the NRAO 90m telescope at Green Bank and, formerly, the Arecibo 305m telescope. Rather than having its own observation program, SERENDIP analyzes deep space radio telescope data that it obtains while other astronomers are using the telescopes. The most recently deployed SERENDIP spectrometer, SERENDIP VI, was installed at both the Arecibo Telescope and the Green Bank Telescope in 2014–2015.

=== Breakthrough Listen ===
Breakthrough Listen is a ten-year initiative with $100 million funding begun in July 2015 to actively search for intelligent extraterrestrial communications in the universe, in a substantially expanded way, using resources that had not previously been extensively used for the purpose. It has been described as the most comprehensive search for alien communications to date. The science program for Breakthrough Listen is based at Berkeley SETI Research Center, located in the Astronomy Department at the University of California, Berkeley.

Announced in July 2015, the project is observing for thousands of hours every year on two major radio telescopes, the Green Bank Observatory in West Virginia, and the Parkes Observatory in Australia. Previously, only about 24 to 36 hours of telescope time per year were used in the search for alien life. Furthermore, the Automated Planet Finder at Lick Observatory is searching for optical signals coming from laser transmissions. The massive data rates from the radio telescopes (24 GB/s at Green Bank) necessitated the construction of dedicated hardware at the telescopes to perform the bulk of the analysis. Some of the data are also analyzed by volunteers in the SETI@home volunteer computing network. Founder of modern SETI Frank Drake was one of the scientists on the project's advisory committee.

In October 2019, Breakthrough Listen started a collaboration with scientists from the TESS team (Transiting Exoplanet Survey Satellite) to look for signs of advanced extraterrestrial life. Thousands of new planets found by TESS will be scanned for technosignatures by Breakthrough Listen partner facilities across the globe. Data from TESS monitoring of stars will also be searched for anomalies.

=== FAST ===
China's 500 meter Aperture Spherical Telescope (FAST) lists detecting interstellar communication signals as part of its science mission. It is funded by the National Development and Reform Commission (NDRC) and managed by the National Astronomical observatories (NAOC) of the Chinese Academy of Sciences (CAS). FAST is the first radio observatory built with SETI as a core scientific goal. FAST consists of a fixed 500 m (1,600 ft) diameter spherical dish constructed in a natural depression sinkhole caused by karst processes in the region. It is the world's largest filled-aperture radio telescope. According to its website, FAST can search to 28 light-years, and is able to reach 1,400 stars. If the transmitter's radiated power were to be increased to 1,000,000 MW, FAST would be able to reach one million stars. This is compared to the former Arecibo 305 meter telescope detection distance of 18 light-years.

On 14 June 2022, astronomers, working with China's FAST telescope, reported the possibility of having detected artificial (presumably alien) signals, but cautioned that further studies were required to determine if a natural radio interference may be the source. More recently, on 18 June 2022, Dan Werthimer, chief scientist for several SETI-related projects, reportedly noted, "These signals are from radio interference; they are due to radio pollution from earthlings, not from E.T.".

=== UCLA ===
Since 2016, University of California Los Angeles (UCLA) undergraduate and graduate students have been participating in radio searches for technosignatures with the Green Bank Telescope. Targets include the Kepler field, TRAPPIST-1, and solar-type stars. The search is sensitive to Arecibo-class transmitters located within 420 light years of Earth and to transmitters that are 1,000 times more powerful than Arecibo located within 13,000 light years of Earth.

== Community SETI projects ==
Screen shot of the screensaver for SETI@home, a former volunteer computing project in which volunteers donated idle computer power to analyze radio signals for signs of extraterrestrial intelligence.

=== SETI@home ===
The SETI@home project used volunteer computing to analyze signals acquired by the SERENDIP project.

SETI@home was conceived by David Gedye along with Craig Kasnoff and is a popular volunteer computing project that was launched by the Berkeley SETI Research Center at the University of California, Berkeley, in May 1999. It was originally funded by The Planetary Society and Paramount Pictures, and later by the state of California. The project is run by director David P. Anderson and chief scientist Dan Werthimer. Any individual could become involved with SETI research by downloading the Berkeley Open Infrastructure for Network Computing (BOINC) software program, attaching to the SETI@home project, and allowing the program to run as a background process that uses idle computer power. The SETI@home program itself ran signal analysis on a "work unit" of data recorded from the central 2.5 MHz wide band of the SERENDIP IV instrument. After computation on the work unit was complete, the results were then automatically reported back to SETI@home servers at University of California, Berkeley. By June 28, 2009, the SETI@home project had over 180,000 active participants volunteering a total of over 290,000 computers. These computers gave SETI@home an average computational power of 617 teraFLOPS. In 2004, radio source SHGb02+14a set off speculation in the media that a signal had been detected but researchers noted the frequency drifted rapidly and the detection on three SETI@home computers fell within random chance.

By 2010, after 10 years of data collection, SETI@home had listened to that one frequency at every point of over 67 percent of the sky observable from Arecibo with at least three scans (out of the goal of nine scans), which covers about 20 percent of the full celestial sphere. On March 31, 2020, with 91,454 active users, the project stopped sending out new work to SETI@home users, bringing this particular SETI effort to an indefinite hiatus.

=== SETI Net ===
SETI Network was the only fully operational private search system. The SETI Net station consisted of off-the-shelf, consumer-grade electronics to minimize cost and to allow this design to be replicated as simply as possible. It had a 3-meter parabolic antenna that could be directed in azimuth and elevation, an LNA that covered 100 MHz of the 1420 MHz spectrum, a receiver to reproduce the wideband audio, and a standard personal computer as the control device and for deploying the detection algorithms. The antenna could be pointed and locked to one sky location in Ra and DEC which enabling the system to integrate on it for long periods. The Wow! signal area was monitored for many long periods. All search data was collected and is available on the Internet archive.

SETI Net started operation in the early 1980s as a way to learn about the science of the search, and developed several software packages for the amateur SETI community. It provided an astronomical clock, a file manager to keep track of SETI data files, a spectrum analyzer optimized for amateur SETI, remote control of the station from the Internet, and other packages.

SETI Net went dark and was decommissioned on 2021-12-04. The collected data is available on their website.

=== The SETI League and Project Argus ===
Founded in 1994 in response to the United States Congress cancellation of the NASA SETI program, The SETI League, Incorporated is a membership-supported nonprofit organization with 1,500 members in 62 countries. This grass-roots alliance of amateur and professional radio astronomers is headed by executive director emeritus H. Paul Shuch, the engineer credited with developing the world's first commercial home satellite TV receiver. Many SETI League members are licensed radio amateurs and microwave experimenters. Others are digital signal processing experts and computer enthusiasts.

The SETI League pioneered the conversion of backyard satellite TV dishes 3 to 5 m (10–16 ft) in diameter into research-grade radio telescopes of modest sensitivity. The organization concentrates on coordinating a global network of small, amateur-built radio telescopes under Project Argus, an all-sky survey seeking to achieve real-time coverage of the entire sky. Project Argus was conceived as a continuation of the all-sky survey component of the late NASA SETI program (the targeted search having been continued by the SETI Institute's Project Phoenix). There are currently 143 Project Argus radio telescopes operating in 27 countries. Project Argus instruments typically exhibit sensitivity on the order of 10^{−23} Watts/square metre, or roughly equivalent to that achieved by the Ohio State University Big Ear radio telescope in 1977, when it detected the landmark "Wow!" candidate signal.

The name "Argus" derives from the mythical Greek guard-beast who had 100 eyes, and could see in all directions at once. In the SETI context, the name has been used for radio telescopes in fiction (Arthur C. Clarke, "Imperial Earth"; Carl Sagan, "Contact"), was the name initially used for the NASA study ultimately known as "Cyclops," and is the name given to an omnidirectional radio telescope design being developed at the Ohio State University.

== Optical experiments ==
While most SETI sky searches have studied the radio spectrum, some SETI researchers have considered the possibility that alien civilizations might be using powerful lasers for interstellar communications at optical wavelengths. The idea was first suggested by R. N. Schwartz and Charles Hard Townes in a 1961 paper published in the journal Nature titled "Interstellar and Interplanetary Communication by Optical Masers". However, the 1971 Cyclops study discounted the possibility of optical SETI, reasoning that construction of a laser system that could outshine the bright central star of a remote star system would be too difficult. In 1983, Townes published a detailed study of the idea in the United States journal Proceedings of the National Academy of Sciences, which was met with interest by the SETI community.

There are two problems with optical SETI. The first problem is that lasers are highly "monochromatic", that is, they emit light only on one frequency, making it troublesome to figure out what frequency to look for. However, emitting light in narrow pulses results in a broad spectrum of emission; the spread in frequency becomes higher as the pulse width becomes narrower, making it easier to detect an emission.

The other problem is that while radio transmissions can be broadcast in all directions, lasers are highly directional. Interstellar gas and dust is almost transparent to near infrared, so these signals can be seen from greater distances, but the extraterrestrial laser signals would need to be transmitted in the direction of Earth in order to be detected.

Optical SETI supporters have conducted paper studies of the effectiveness of using contemporary high-energy lasers and a ten-meter diameter mirror as an interstellar beacon. The analysis shows that an infrared pulse from a laser, focused into a narrow beam by such a mirror, would appear thousands of times brighter than the Sun to a distant civilization in the beam's line of fire. The Cyclops study proved incorrect in suggesting a laser beam would be inherently hard to see.

Such a system could be made to automatically steer itself through a target list, sending a pulse to each target at a constant rate. This would allow targeting of all Sun-like stars within a distance of 100 light-years. The studies have also described an automatic laser pulse detector system with a low-cost, two-meter mirror made of carbon composite materials, focusing on an array of light detectors. This automatic detector system could perform sky surveys to detect laser flashes from civilizations attempting contact.

Several optical SETI experiments are now in progress. A Harvard-Smithsonian group that includes Paul Horowitz designed a laser detector and mounted it on Harvard's 155-centimeter (61-inch) optical telescope. This telescope is currently being used for a more conventional star survey, and the optical SETI survey is "piggybacking" on that effort. Between October 1998 and November 1999, the survey inspected about 2,500 stars. Nothing that resembled an intentional laser signal was detected, but efforts continue. The Harvard-Smithsonian group is now working with Princeton University to mount a similar detector system on Princeton's 91-centimeter (36-inch) telescope. The Harvard and Princeton telescopes will be "ganged" to track the same targets at the same time, with the intent being to detect the same signal in both locations as a means of reducing errors from detector noise.

The Harvard-Smithsonian SETI group led by Professor Paul Horowitz built a dedicated all-sky optical survey system along the lines of that described above, featuring a 1.8-meter (72-inch) telescope. The new optical SETI survey telescope is being set up at the Oak Ridge Observatory in Harvard, Massachusetts.

The University of California, Berkeley, home of SERENDIP and SETI@home, is also conducting optical SETI searches and collaborates with the NIROSETI program. The optical SETI program at Breakthrough Listen was initially directed by Geoffrey Marcy, an extrasolar planet hunter, and it involves examination of records of spectra taken during extrasolar planet hunts for a continuous, rather than pulsed, laser signal. This survey uses the Automated Planet Finder 2.4-m telescope at the Lick Observatory, situated on the summit of Mount Hamilton, east of San Jose, California. The other Berkeley optical SETI effort is being pursued by the Harvard-Smithsonian group and is being directed by Dan Werthimer of Berkeley, who built the laser detector for the Harvard-Smithsonian group. This survey uses a 76-centimeter (30-inch) automated telescope at Leuschner Observatory and an older laser detector built by Werthimer.

The SETI Institute also runs a program called 'Laser SETI' with an instrument composed of several cameras that continuously survey the entire night sky searching for millisecond singleton laser pulses of extraterrestrial origin.

In January 2020, two Pulsed All-sky Near-infrared Optical SETI (PANOSETI) project telescopes were installed in the Lick Observatory Astrograph Dome. The project aims to commence a wide-field optical SETI search and continue prototyping designs for a full observatory. The installation can offer an "all-observable-sky" optical and wide-field near-infrared pulsed technosignature and astrophysical transient search for the northern hemisphere.

In May 2017, astronomers reported studies related to laser light emissions from stars, as a way of detecting technology-related signals from an alien civilization. The reported studies included Tabby's Star (designated KIC 8462852 in the Kepler Input Catalog), an oddly dimming star in which its unusual starlight fluctuations may be the result of interference by an artificial megastructure, such as a Dyson swarm, made by such a civilization. No evidence was found for technology-related signals from KIC 8462852 in the studies.

== Quantum communications ==
In a 2020 paper, Berera examined sources of decoherence in the interstellar medium and made the observation that quantum coherence of photons in certain frequency bands could be sustained to interstellar distances. It was suggested this would allow for quantum communication at these distances.

In a 2021 preprint, astronomer Michael Hipke described for the first time how one could search for quantum communication transmissions sent by ETI using existing telescope and receiver technology. He also provides arguments for why future searches of ETI should also target interstellar quantum communication networks.

A 2022 paper by Arjun Berera and Jaime Calderón-Figueroa noted that interstellar quantum communication by other civilizations could be possible and may be advantageous, identifying some potential challenges and factors for detecting technosignatures. They may, for example, use X-ray photons for remotely established quantum communication and quantum teleportation as the communication mode.

== Search for extraterrestrial artifacts ==
The possibility of using interstellar messenger probes in the search for extraterrestrial intelligence was first suggested by Ronald N. Bracewell in 1960 (see Bracewell probe), and the technical feasibility of this approach was demonstrated by the British Interplanetary Society's starship study Project Daedalus in 1978. Starting in 1979, Robert Freitas advanced arguments for the proposition that physical space-probes are a superior mode of interstellar communication to radio signals (see Voyager Golden Record).

In recognition that any sufficiently advanced interstellar probe in the vicinity of Earth could easily monitor the terrestrial Internet, 'Invitation to ETI' was established by Allen Tough in 1996, as a Web-based SETI experiment inviting such spacefaring probes to establish contact with humanity. The project's 100 signatories includes prominent physical, biological, and social scientists, as well as artists, educators, entertainers, philosophers and futurists. H. Paul Shuch, executive director emeritus of The SETI League, serves as the project's Principal Investigator.

Inscribing a message in matter and transporting it to an interstellar destination can be enormously more energy efficient than communication using electromagnetic waves if delays larger than light transit time can be tolerated. That said, for simple messages such as "hello," radio SETI could be far more efficient. If energy requirement is used as a proxy for technical difficulty, then a solarcentric Search for Extraterrestrial Artifacts (SETA) may be a useful supplement to traditional radio or optical searches.

Much like the "preferred frequency" concept in SETI radio beacon theory, the Earth-Moon or Sun-Earth libration orbits might therefore constitute the most universally convenient parking places for automated extraterrestrial spacecraft exploring arbitrary stellar systems. A viable long-term SETI program may be founded upon a search for these objects.

In 1979, Freitas and Valdes conducted a photographic search of the vicinity of the Earth-Moon triangular libration points L_{4} and L_{5}, and of the solar-synchronized positions in the associated halo orbits, seeking possible orbiting extraterrestrial interstellar probes, but found nothing to a detection limit of about 14th magnitude. The authors conducted a second, more comprehensive photographic search for probes in 1982 that examined the five Earth-Moon Lagrangian positions and included the solar-synchronized positions in the stable L4/L5 libration orbits, the potentially stable nonplanar orbits near L1/L2, Earth-Moon L_{3}, and also L_{2} in the Sun-Earth system. Again no extraterrestrial probes were found to limiting magnitudes of 17–19th magnitude near L3/L4/L5, 10–18th magnitude for L_{1}/L_{2}, and 14–16th magnitude for Sun-Earth L_{2}.

In June 1983, Valdes and Freitas used the 26 m radiotelescope at Hat Creek Radio Observatory to search for the tritium hyperfine line at 1516 MHz from 108 assorted astronomical objects, with emphasis on 53 nearby stars including all visible stars within a 20 light-year radius. The tritium frequency was deemed highly attractive for SETI work because (1) the isotope is cosmically rare, (2) the tritium hyperfine line is centered in the SETI water hole region of the terrestrial microwave window, and (3) in addition to beacon signals, tritium hyperfine emission may occur as a byproduct of extensive nuclear fusion energy production by extraterrestrial civilizations. The wideband- and narrowband-channel observations achieved sensitivities of 5–14×10^{−21} W/m^{2}/channel and 0.7–2×10^{−24} W/m^{2}/channel, respectively, but no detections were made.

Others have speculated that we might find traces of past civilizations in our very own Solar System, on planets like Venus or Mars, although the traces would be found most likely underground.

== Technosignatures ==
Technosignatures, including all signs of technology, are a recent avenue in the search for extraterrestrial intelligence. Technosignatures may originate from various sources, from megastructures such as Dyson spheres and space mirrors or space shaders to the atmospheric contamination created by an industrial civilization, or city lights on extrasolar planets, and may be detectable in the future with large hypertelescopes.

Technosignatures can be divided into three broad categories: astroengineering projects, signals of planetary origin, and spacecraft within and outside the Solar System.

An astroengineering installation such as a Dyson sphere, designed to convert all of the incident radiation of its host star into energy, could be detected through the observation of an infrared excess from a solar analog star, or by the star's apparent disappearance in the visible spectrum over several years. After examining some 100,000 nearby large galaxies, a team of researchers has concluded that none of them display any obvious signs of highly advanced technological civilizations.

Another hypothetical form of astroengineering, the Shkadov thruster, moves its host star by reflecting some of the star's light back on itself, and would be detected by observing if its transits across the star abruptly end with the thruster in front. Asteroid mining within the Solar System is also a detectable technosignature of the first kind.

Individual extrasolar planets can be analyzed for signs of technology. Avi Loeb of the Center for Astrophysics | Harvard & Smithsonian has proposed that persistent light signals on the night side of an exoplanet can be an indication of the presence of cities and an advanced civilization. In addition, the excess infrared radiation and chemicals produced by various industrial processes or terraforming efforts may point to intelligence.

Light and heat detected from planets need to be distinguished from natural sources to conclusively prove the existence of civilization on a planet. However, as argued by the Colossus team, a civilization heat signature should be within a "comfortable" temperature range, like terrestrial urban heat islands, i.e., only a few degrees warmer than the planet itself. In contrast, such natural sources as wild fires, volcanoes, etc. are significantly hotter, so they will be well distinguished by their maximum flux at a different wavelength.

Other than astroengineering, technosignatures such as artificial satellites around exoplanets, particularly such in geostationary orbit, might be detectable even with today's technology and data, and would allow, similar to fossils on Earth, to find traces of extrasolar life from long ago.

Extraterrestrial craft are another target in the search for technosignatures. Magnetic sail interstellar spacecraft should be detectable over thousands of light-years of distance through the synchrotron radiation they would produce through interaction with the interstellar medium; other interstellar spacecraft designs may be detectable at more modest distances. In addition, robotic probes within the Solar System are also being sought with optical and radio searches.

For a sufficiently advanced civilization, hyper energetic neutrinos from Planck scale accelerators should be detectable at a distance of many Mpc.

== Fermi paradox ==
Italian physicist Enrico Fermi suggested in the 1950s that if technologically advanced civilizations are common in the universe, then they should be detectable in one way or another. According to those who were there, Fermi either asked "Where are they?" or "Where is everybody?"

The Fermi paradox is commonly understood as asking why extraterrestrials have not visited Earth, but the same reasoning applies to the question of why signals from extraterrestrials have not been heard. The SETI version of the question is sometimes referred to as "the Great Silence".

The Fermi paradox can be stated more completely as follows:

The size and age of the universe incline us to believe that many technologically advanced civilizations must exist. However, this belief seems logically inconsistent with our lack of observational evidence to support it. Either (1) the initial assumption is incorrect and technologically advanced intelligent life is much rarer than we believe, or (2) our current observations are incomplete, and we simply have not detected them yet, or (3) our search methodologies are flawed and we are not searching for the correct indicators, or (4) it is the nature of intelligent life to destroy itself.

There are multiple explanations proposed for the Fermi paradox, ranging from analyses suggesting that intelligent life is rare (the "Rare Earth hypothesis"), to analyses suggesting that although extraterrestrial civilizations may be common, they would not communicate with us, would communicate in a way we have not discovered yet, could not travel across interstellar distances, or destroy themselves before they master the technology of either interstellar travel or communication.

The German astrophysicist and radio astronomer Sebastian von Hoerner suggested that the average duration of civilization was 6,500 years. After this time, according to him, it disappears for external reasons (the destruction of life on the planet, the destruction of only rational beings) or internal causes (mental or physical degeneration). According to his calculations, on a habitable planet (one in three million stars) there is a sequence of technological species over a time distance of hundreds of millions of years, and each of them "produces" an average of four technological species. With these assumptions, the average distance between civilizations in the Milky Way is 1,000 light years.

Science writer Timothy Ferris has posited that since galactic societies are most likely only transitory, an obvious solution is an interstellar communications network, or a type of library consisting mostly of automated systems. They would store the cumulative knowledge of vanished civilizations and communicate that knowledge through the galaxy. Ferris calls this the "Interstellar Internet", with the various automated systems acting as network "servers". If such an Interstellar Internet exists, the hypothesis states, communications between servers are mostly through narrow-band, highly directional radio or laser links. Intercepting such signals is, as discussed earlier, very difficult. However, the network could maintain some broadcast nodes in hopes of making contact with new civilizations.

Although somewhat dated in terms of "information culture" arguments, not to mention the obvious technological problems of a system that could work effectively for billions of years and requires multiple lifeforms agreeing on certain basics of communications technologies, this hypothesis is actually testable (see below).

=== Difficulty of detection ===
A significant problem is the vastness of space. Despite using the world's most sensitive radio telescope, astronomer and initiator of SERENDIP, Charles Stuart Bowyer, noted the world's largest instrument of the time could not detect random radio noise emanating from a civilization like ours, which has been leaking radio and television signals for less than 100 years. For SERENDIP and most other SETI projects to detect a signal from an extraterrestrial civilization, the civilization would have to be beaming a powerful signal directly at us. It also means that Earth's civilizations will only be detectable within a distance of 100 light-years.

== Post-detection disclosure protocol ==
The International Academy of Astronautics (IAA) has a long-standing SETI Permanent Study Group (SPSG, formerly called the IAA SETI Committee), which addresses matters of SETI science, technology, and international policy. The SPSG meets in conjunction with the International Astronautical Congress (IAC), held annually at different locations around the world, and sponsors two SETI Symposia at each IAC. In 2005, the IAA established the SETI: Post-Detection Science and Technology Taskgroup (chairman, Professor Paul Davies) "to act as a Standing Committee to be available to be called on at any time to advise and consult on questions stemming from the discovery of a putative signal of extraterrestrial intelligent (ETI) origin."

However, the protocols mentioned apply only to radio SETI rather than for METI (Active SETI). The intention for METI is covered under the SETI charter "Declaration of Principles Concerning Sending Communications with Extraterrestrial Intelligence".

In June 2026, IAA ratified the first update to the protocol, following years of SPSG work and deliberations at IAA meetings.

In October 2000 astronomers Iván Almár and Jill Tarter presented a paper to The SETI Permanent Study Group in Rio de Janeiro, Brazil which proposed a scale (modelled after the Torino scale) which is an ordinal scale between zero and ten that quantifies the impact of any public announcement regarding evidence of extraterrestrial intelligence; the Rio scale has since inspired the 2005 San Marino Scale (in regard to the risks of transmissions from Earth) and the 2010 London Scale (in regard to the detection of extraterrestrial life). The Rio scale itself was revised in 2018.

The SETI Institute does not officially recognize the Wow! signal as of extraterrestrial origin as it was unable to be verified, although in a 2020 Twitter post the organization stated that ''an astronomer might have pinpointed the host star''. The SETI Institute has also publicly denied that the candidate signal Radio source SHGb02+14a is of extraterrestrial origin. Although other volunteering projects such as Zooniverse credit users for discoveries, there is currently no crediting or early notification by SETI@Home following the discovery of a signal.

Some people, including Steven M. Greer, have expressed cynicism that the general public might not be informed in the event of a genuine discovery of extraterrestrial intelligence due to significant vested interests. Some, such as Bruce Jakosky have also argued that the official disclosure of extraterrestrial life may have far reaching and as yet undetermined implications for society, particularly for the world's religions.

== Active SETI ==
Active SETI, also known as messaging to extraterrestrial intelligence (METI), consists of sending signals into space in the hope that they will be detected by an alien intelligence.

=== Realized interstellar radio message projects ===
In November 1974, a largely symbolic attempt was made at the Arecibo Observatory to send a message to other worlds. Known as the Arecibo Message, it was sent towards the globular cluster M13, which is 25,000 light-years from Earth. Further IRMs Cosmic Call, Teen Age Message, Cosmic Call 2, and A Message From Earth were transmitted in 1999, 2001, 2003 and 2008 from the Evpatoria Planetary Radar.

=== Debate ===
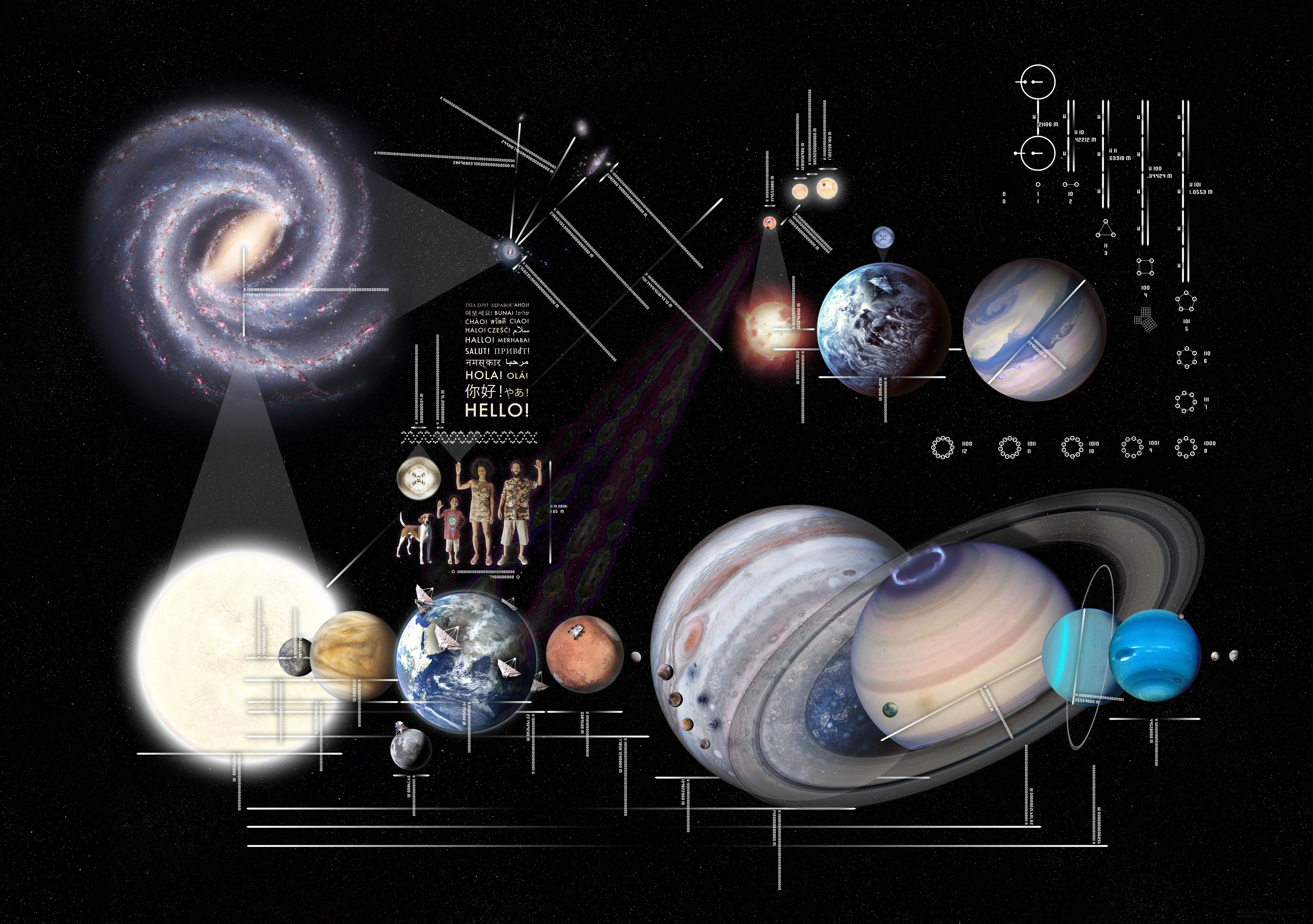
Example of a high-resolution pictorial message to potential ETI. These messages usually contain information about the location of the solar system in the Milky Way.

Whether or not to attempt to contact extraterrestrials has attracted significant academic debate in the fields of space ethics and space policy. Physicist Stephen Hawking, in his book A Brief History of Time, suggests that "alerting" extraterrestrial intelligences to our existence is foolhardy, citing humankind's history of treating its own kind harshly in meetings of civilizations with a significant technology gap, e.g., the extermination of Tasmanian aborigines. He suggests, in view of this history, that we "lay low". In one response to Hawking, in September 2016, astronomer Seth Shostak sought to allay such concerns. Astronomer Jill Tarter also disagrees with Hawking, arguing that aliens developed and long-lived enough to communicate and travel across interstellar distances would have evolved a cooperative and less violent intelligence. She however thinks it is too soon for humans to attempt active SETI and that humans should be more advanced technologically first but keep listening in the meantime.

== Criticism ==
As various SETI projects have progressed, some have criticized early claims by researchers as being too "euphoric". For example, Peter Schenkel, while remaining a supporter of SETI projects, wrote in 2006 that:

[i]n light of new findings and insights, it seems appropriate to put excessive euphoria to rest and to take a more down-to-earth view ... We should quietly admit that the early estimates—that there may be a million, a hundred thousand, or ten thousand advanced extraterrestrial civilizations in our galaxy—may no longer be tenable.

Critics claim that the existence of extraterrestrial intelligence has no good Popperian criteria for falsifiability, as explained in a 2009 editorial in Nature, which said:

Seti ... has always sat at the edge of mainstream astronomy. This is partly because, no matter how scientifically rigorous its practitioners try to be, SETI can't escape an association with UFO believers and other such crackpots. But it is also because SETI is arguably not a falsifiable experiment. Regardless of how exhaustively the Galaxy is searched, the null result of radio silence doesn't rule out the existence of alien civilizations. It means only that those civilizations might not be using radio to communicate.

Nature added that SETI was "marked by a hope, bordering on faith" that aliens were aiming signals at us, that a hypothetical alien SETI project looking at Earth with "similar faith" would be "sorely disappointed", despite our many untargeted radar and TV signals, and our few targeted Active SETI radio signals denounced by those fearing aliens, and that it had difficulties attracting even sympathetic working scientists and government funding because it was "an effort so likely to turn up nothing".

However, Nature also added, "Nonetheless, a small SETI effort is well worth supporting, especially given the enormous implications if it did succeed" and that "happily, a handful of wealthy technologists and other private donors have proved willing to provide that support".

Supporters of the Rare Earth Hypothesis argue that advanced lifeforms are likely to be very rare, and that, if that is so, then SETI efforts will be futile. However, the Rare Earth Hypothesis itself faces many criticisms.

In 1993, Roy Mash stated that "Arguments favoring the existence of extraterrestrial intelligence nearly always contain an overt appeal to big numbers, often combined with a covert reliance on generalization from a single instance" and concluded that "the dispute between believers and skeptics is seen to boil down to a conflict of intuitions which can barely be engaged, let alone resolved, given our present state of knowledge". In response, in 2012, Milan M. Ćirković, then research professor at the Astronomical Observatory of Belgrade and a research associate of the Future of Humanity Institute at the University of Oxford, said that Mash was unrealistically over-reliant on excessive abstraction that ignored the empirical information available to modern SETI researchers.

George Basalla, Emeritus Professor of History at the University of Delaware, is a critic of SETI who argued in 2006 that "extraterrestrials discussed by scientists are as imaginary as the spirits and gods of religion or myth", and was in turn criticized by Milan M. Ćirković for, among other things, being unable to distinguish between "SETI believers" and "scientists engaged in SETI", who are often sceptical (especially about quick detection), such as Freeman Dyson and, at least in their later years, Iosif Shklovsky and Sebastian von Hoerner, and for ignoring the difference between the knowledge underlying the arguments of modern scientists and those of ancient Greek thinkers.

Massimo Pigliucci, Professor of Philosophy at CUNY – City College, asked in 2010 whether SETI is "uncomfortably close to the status of pseudoscience" due to the lack of any clear point at which negative results cause the hypothesis of Extraterrestrial Intelligence to be abandoned, before eventually concluding that SETI is "almost-science", which is described by Milan M. Ćirković as Pigliucci putting SETI in "the illustrious company of string theory, interpretations of quantum mechanics, evolutionary psychology and history (of the 'synthetic' kind done recently by Jared Diamond)", while adding that his justification for doing so with SETI "is weak, outdated, and reflecting particular philosophical prejudices similar to the ones described above in Mash and Basalla".

Richard Carrigan, a particle physicist at the Fermi National Accelerator Laboratory near Chicago, Illinois, suggested that passive SETI could also be dangerous and that a signal released onto the Internet could act as a computer virus. Computer security expert Bruce Schneier dismissed this possibility as a "bizarre movie-plot threat".

In an attempt to present the search for extraterrestrial intelligence within a broader historical context, Lewis White Beck at the University of Rochester traced its development within the works of several philosophers of the Western tradition including: Lucretius, Plutarch, Aristotle, Copernicus, Immanuel Kant, John Wilkins, Charles Darwin and Karl Marx. His analysis suggests that even in modern times, humanity's "objective quest" can be clouded by ancient archetypal paradigms which are derived from firmly rooted religious, philosophical and existential belief systems. Citing the difficulties associated with an anthropomorphic paradigm of extraterrestrial intelligence, Beck noted that, "Myth, religion, and now science-fiction ... are commentaries on the human condition. I believe even responsible scientific speculation ... in search for other life are the peculiarly modern equivalent of angelology and Utopia or of demonology and apocalypse."

Beck also raises epistemological doubts as to whether a "successful" detection of modulated radio signals from the heavens could be deciphered at all by noting that "in the absence of collateral information, the necessary but not sufficient condition for knowing that something is a message is to know what it says. Since the necessary collateral information will be lacking, we must guess that it is a message, guess what it says, and then try to see if the signal can convey that message." Complicating matters further are the difficulties associated with identifying a rational vocabulary of denotive words which might be contained within such a message. Citing the work of Peter Winch, Beck notes that humanity need not succumb to despair, however, for "to study another way of life is necessarily to seek to extend our own-- not simply to bring the other way within the already existing boundaries of our own". Beck therefore concludes optimistically by suggesting that even if a world-wide sharing of radio observatories fails to detect the presence of extraterrestrial intelligence, it may prove invaluable to identifying superior enlightened intellectual paradigms for human life on our own Earth.

=== Ufology ===
Ufologist Stanton Friedman has often criticized SETI researchers for, among other reasons, what he sees as their unscientific criticisms of ufology, but, unlike SETI, ufology has generally not been embraced by academia as a scientific field of study, and it is usually characterized as a partial or total pseudoscience. In a 2016 interview, Jill Tarter pointed out that it is still a misconception that SETI and UFOs are related. She states, "SETI uses the tools of the astronomer to attempt to find evidence of somebody else's technology coming from a great distance. If we ever claim detection of a signal, we will provide evidence and data that can be independently confirmed. UFOs—none of the above." The Galileo Project headed by Harvard astronomer Avi Loeb is one of the few scientific efforts to study UFOs or UAPs. Loeb criticized that the study of UAP is often dismissed and not sufficiently studied by scientists and should shift from "occupying the talking points of national security administrators and politicians" to the realm of science. The Galileo Project's position after the publication of the 2021 UFO Report by the U.S. Intelligence community is that the scientific community needs to "systematically, scientifically and transparently look for potential evidence of extraterrestrial technological equipment".

== See also ==
- Alien language – Hypothetical language of extraterrestrial beings
- Arecibo message – Radio message sent into space in 1974
- Astrobiology – Science concerned with life in the universe
- Astrobiology Science and Technology for Exploring Planets – Former NASA program
- Breakthrough Listen – Initiative to search for intelligent extraterrestrial life
  - BLC1 – Narrowband radio signal detected in April and May 2019
- Communication with extraterrestrial intelligence – Branch of SETI
- Darwin Mission – 2007 European study concept of an array of space observatories a suggested mission involving a constellation of spacecraft to directly detect Earth-like planets
- Detecting Earth from distant star-based systems – Detecting Earth as an exoplanet – e.g. detectability to SETI programs by extraterrestrials
- First contact (science fiction) – Science fiction theme about the first meeting between humans and extraterrestrial life
- Hypothetical life forms inside stars
- Kardashev scale – Measure of a civilization's evolution
- Metalaw – Concept of space law
- Nexus for Exoplanet System Science – Dedicated to the search for life on exoplanets
- OpenSonATA Open SETI on the Allen Telescope Array
- Potential cultural impact of extraterrestrial contact – Topic in futurism
- Quiet and loud aliens – Concept in astrobiology
- Radio signal from HD 164595 – Star in the constellation of Hercules potential SETI signal
- SETIcon – Public conventions on the search for extraterrestrial intelligence
- setiQuest – Inactive interstellar scientific project
- Xenoarchaeology – Hypothetical form of archaeology of remnants of alien civilizations
