= Water hole (radio) =

Band of the electromagnetic spectrum

Plot of Earth's atmospheric transmittance (or opacity) to various wavelengths of electromagnetic radiation

The waterhole, or water hole, is an especially quiet band of the electromagnetic spectrum between 1420 and 1662 megahertz, corresponding to wavelengths of 18–21 centimeters. It is a popular observing frequency used by radio telescopes in radio astronomy.

The strongest hydroxyl radical spectral line radiates at 18 centimeters, and atomic hydrogen at 21 centimeters (the hydrogen line). These two molecules, which combine to form water, are widespread in interstellar gas, which means this gas tends to absorb radio noise at these frequencies. Therefore, the spectrum between these frequencies forms a relatively "quiet" channel in the interstellar radio noise background.

Bernard M. Oliver, who coined the term in 1971, theorized that the waterhole would be an obvious band for communication with extraterrestrial intelligence, hence the name, which is a pun: in English, a watering hole is a vernacular reference to a common place to meet and talk. Several programs involved in the search for extraterrestrial intelligence, including SETI@home, search in the waterhole radio frequencies.

== In popular culture ==
The Boards of Canada track "Prophecy At 1420 MHz", released as a single with the intro track "Introit" on May 7, 2026, is likely a reference to the hydrogen line.

== See also ==
- BLC1
- Wow! signal
- Radio source SHGb02+14a
- Schelling point
