= Anna L. Nickel telescope =

Telescope

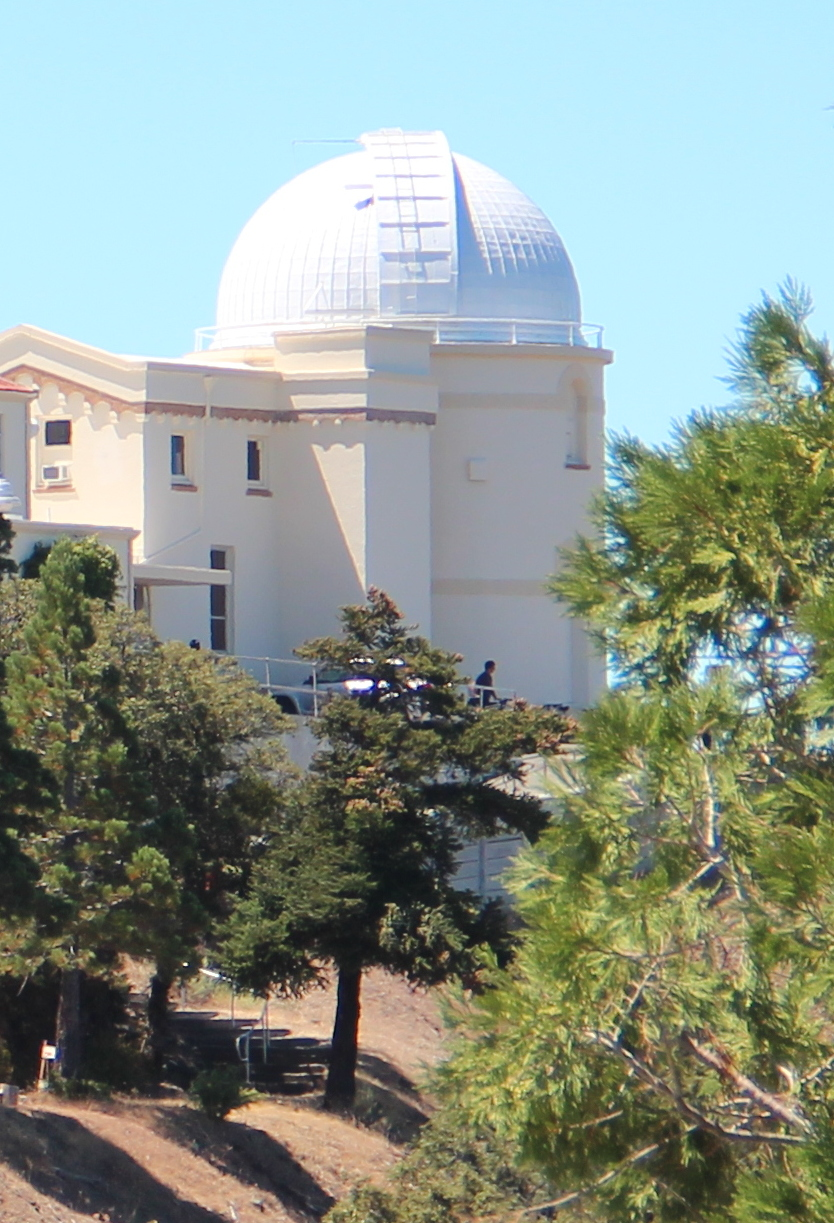
- The Anna L. Nickel telescope dome
- Alternative names: Lick 1m Nickel Reflector
- Location(s): Lick Observatory Main Building, Santa Clara County, California, Pacific States Region
- Coordinates: 37°20′30″N 121°38′34″W
- Diameter: 1 m (3 ft 3 in)
- Website: www.ucolick.org/public/telescopes/nickel.html
- Location of Anna L. Nickel telescope
- Related media on Commons

The Anna L. Nickel telescope is a 1-meter reflecting telescope located at Lick Observatory in the U.S. state of California.

The smaller dome on the main building at Lick had originally held the secondhand 12-inch Clark refracting telescope, the first telescope to be used at Lick. In 1979 it was replaced with the Anna L. Nickel telescope, a 1-meter reflecting telescope. The telescope is named for Anna L. Nickel, a San Francisco native who donated $50,000, a large portion of her estate, to the Observatory.

The Nickel telescope was built entirely by UC Santa Cruz personnel and utilized many spare parts, including a replacement mirror for the Crossley Reflector. It eased demand for time on the 120-inch C. Donald Shane telescope by taking on research programs that do not require the Shane's greater light-gathering power. Due to its optical design, it can use the same instruments as the Shane so instruments can be tested on it.

== See also ==
- List of largest optical telescopes in the 20th century
- List of astronomical observatories
