= BLC1 =

Narrowband radio signal detected in April and May 2019

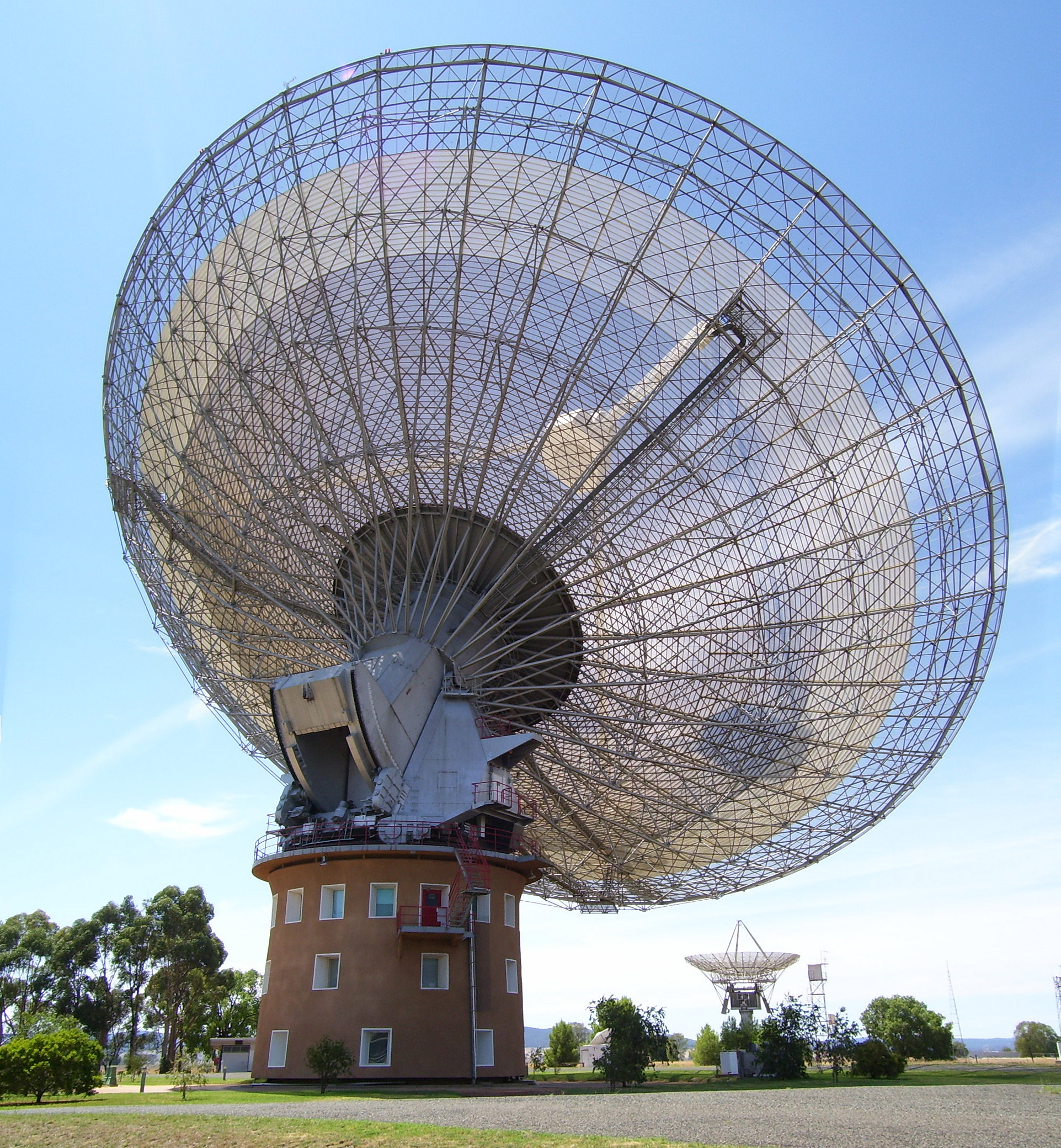
Parkes Observatory that detected BLC-1

BLC1 (Breakthrough Listen Candidate 1) was a candidate SETI radio signal detected and observed during April and May 2019, and first reported on 18 December 2020, spatially coincident with the direction of the Solar System's closest neighboring star, Proxima Centauri.

== Signal ==
The apparent shift in its frequency, consistent with the Doppler effect, was suggested to be inconsistent with what would be caused by the movement of Proxima b, a planet of Proxima Centauri. The Doppler shift in the signal was the opposite of what would be expected from the Earth's spin, in that the signal was observed to increase in frequency rather than decrease. Although the signal was detected by Parkes Radio Telescope during observations of Proxima Centauri, due to the beam angle of Parkes Radio telescope, the signal would be more accurately described as having come from within a circle roughly 16 arcminutes (approximately 1/4 of a degree, half the angular width of Earth's moon) in angular diameter, containing Proxima Centauri, so the signal could have originated elsewhere in the Alpha Centauri system. The signal had a frequency of 982.002 MHz.

The radio signal was detected during 30 hours of observations conducted by Breakthrough Listen through the Parkes Observatory in Australia in April and May 2019. As of December 2020, follow-up observations had failed to detect the signal again, a step necessary to confirm that the signal was a technosignature.

== Origin ==
A paper by other astronomers released 10 days before the news report about BLC1 reports the detection of "a bright, long-duration optical flare, accompanied by a series of intense, coherent radio bursts" from Proxima Centauri also in April and May 2019. Their finding has not been put in direct relation to the BLC1 signal by scientists or media outlets as of January 2021 but implies that planets around Proxima Centauri and other red dwarfs are uninhabitable for humans and other currently known organisms.

In February 2021, a new study proposed that, as the probability of a radio-transmitting civilization emerging on the Sun's closest stellar neighbour was calculated to be approximately 10^{−8}, the Copernican principle made BLC1 very unlikely to be a technological radio signal from the Alpha Centauri System.

On 25 October 2021, researchers published two studies concluding that the signal is unlikely to be a technosignature due to its similarity to previously detected terrestrial interference.

== See also ==
- List of interstellar radio messages
- Wow! signal
