= Arne Slettebak =

American astronomer (1925–1999)

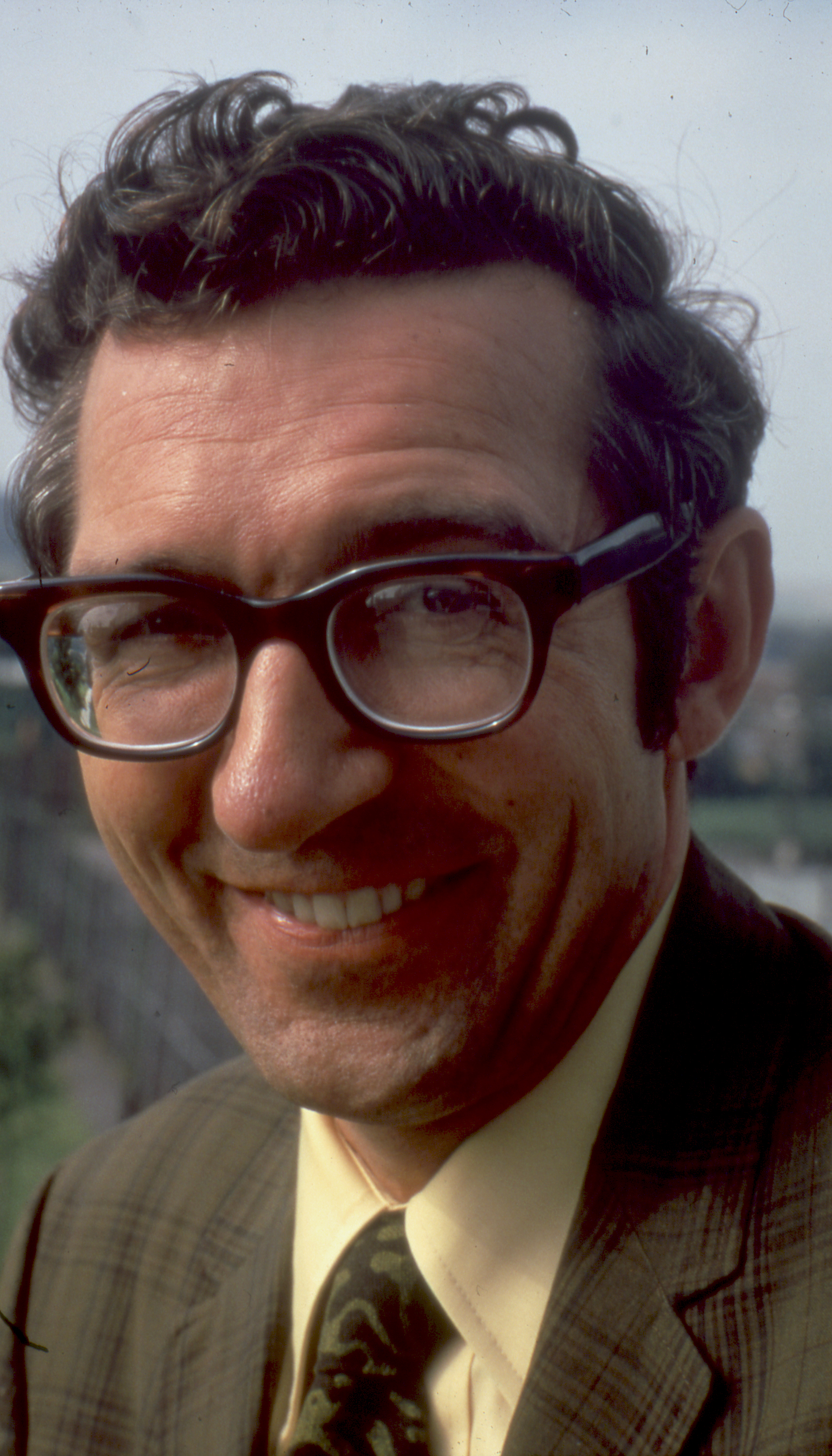
- Slettebak in 1970
- Born: August 8, 1925; Free City of Danzig
- Died: May 20, 1999 (aged 73); Worthington, Ohio, United States
- Citizenship: United States (1932–1999)
- Education: University of Chicago (BS, PhD)
- Spouse: Constance Pixler (m. 1949)
- Children: 2
- Scientific career
- Fields: Astronomy
- Workplaces: Yerkes Observatory; Ohio State University; Perkins Observatory; McMillin Observatory
- Thesis: On the Axial Rotation of the Brighter O and B Stars (1949)
- Doctoral advisor: William Wilson Morgan

Arne Edwin Slettebak (August 8, 1925 – May 20, 1999) was an American astronomer who served as chair of the astronomy department at the Ohio State University from 1962 to 1987 and director of the Perkins Observatory from 1959 to 1978.

Slettebak was born in the Free City of Danzig before emigrating to the United States at a young age. He obtained a degree in physics in 1945 and his doctorate in astronomy in 1949, the latter under the supervision of William Wilson Morgan with a thesis on O-type and B-type stars. Slettebak joined the Ohio State University shortly after graduating and was instrumental in re-establishing a separate astronomy department there. His principal research interests were in stellar rotation and Be stars, and he published over 90 papers, abstracts and articles.

The main-belt asteroid 9001 Slettebak, discovered in 1981, was named in his honour.

== Early life and education ==
Arne Edwin Slettebak was born in the Free City of Danzig (in modern-day Gdańsk, Poland) on August 8, 1925, to Norwegian parents. His family emigrated to the United States in 1927, and he gained American citizenship in 1932. He studied at the University of Chicago, graduating with a BS degree in physics in 1945 and obtaining a PhD in astronomy in 1949. His doctoral dissertation, which he completed under the guidance of William Wilson Morgan, was concerned with the rotational velocities of O-type and B-type stars. As a graduate student, he worked as a research assistant at the Yerkes Observatory conducting astronomical spectroscopy investigations. He also contributed to parts of what became the Morgan-Keenan system together with Morgan's other doctoral students Nancy Grace Roman and William P. Bidelman.

== Career ==
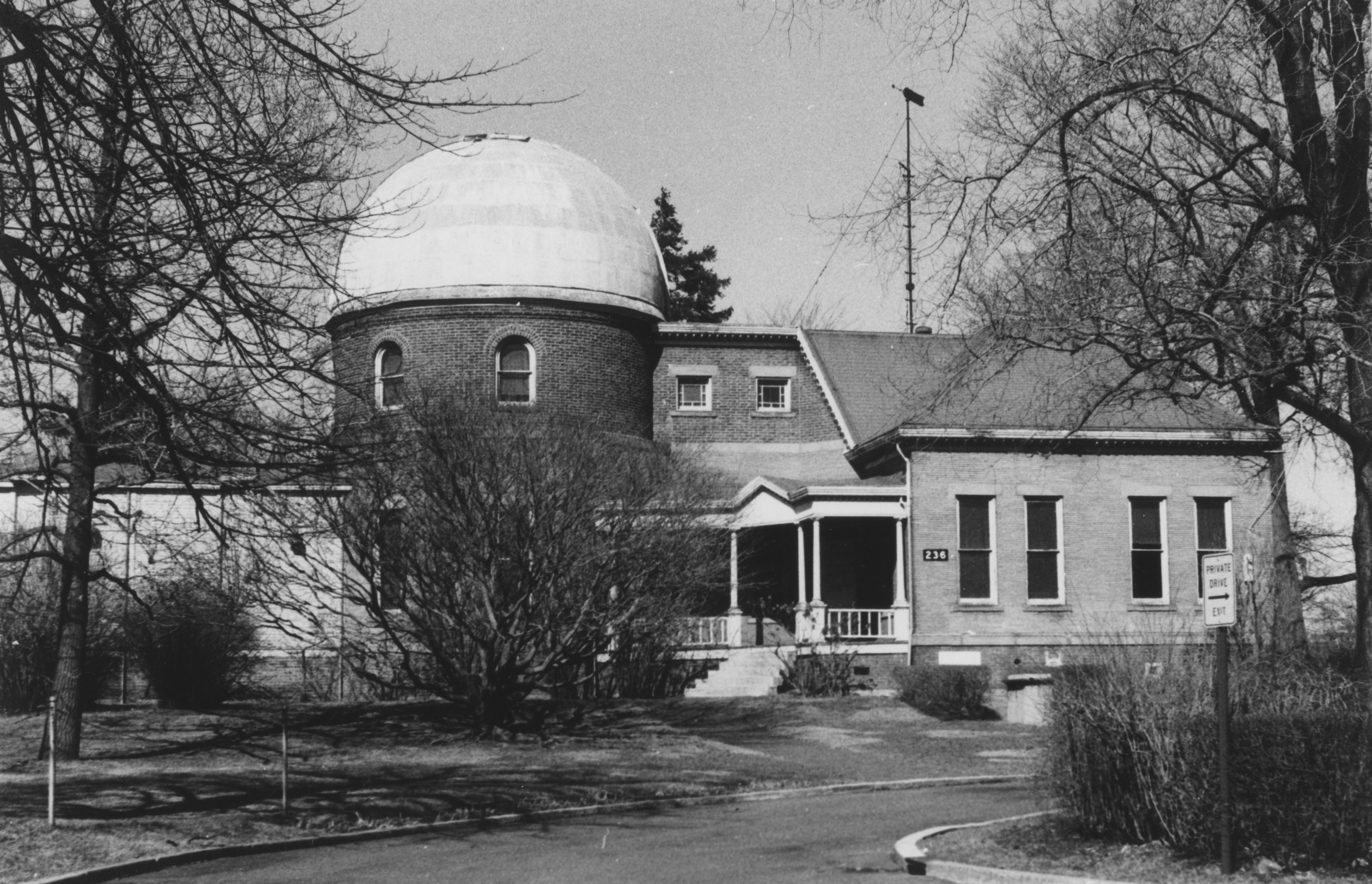
Site of the McMillin Observatory pictured in 1971

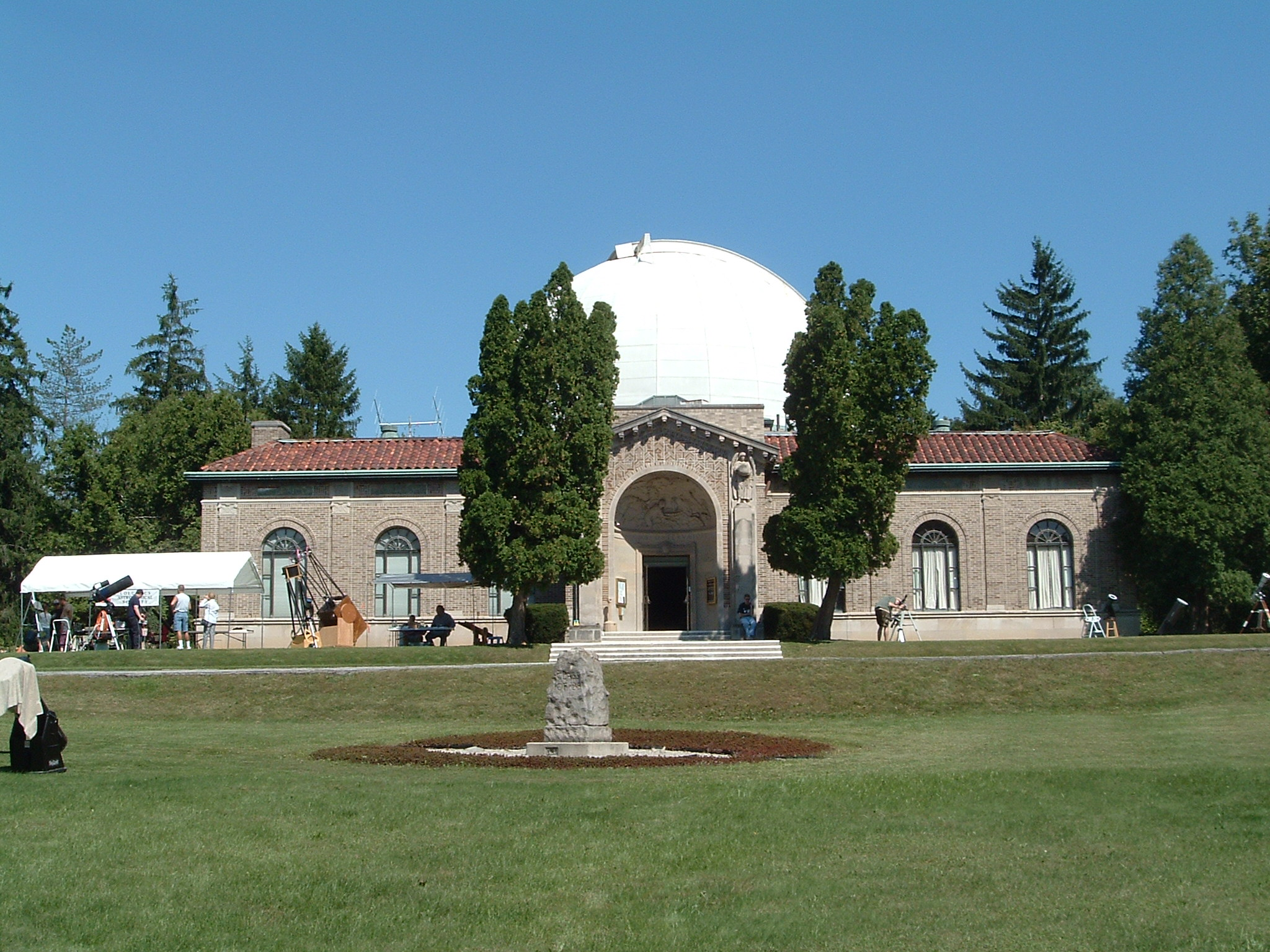
Main facade of the Perkins Observatory

After receiving his PhD, Slettebak joined the Ohio State University as an instructor the same year. He became assistant professor in 1950 and held a Fulbright fellowship at the Hamburg Observatory for the 1955–56 academic year, where he conducted research on the structures of galaxies.

He was promoted to associate professor in 1958 and then full professor in 1959 when he assumed the role of director of the Perkins Observatory from Geoffrey Keller; he would hold this position until 1978. Also in 1959, he took over directorship of the McMillin Observatory from J. Allen Hynek.

Slettebak was a major force in the re-establishment of a separate astronomy department, which was approved in November 1962. He became chair of the newly independent entity and remained in this position until 1987. From 1964 to 1968, he supervised the department's move from the McMillin Observatory, whose building had been deemed too small and unsafe, and Orton Hall to its current location at the Smith Physics Laboratory. (Note: Instruction and research at the McMillin Observatory had already diminished significantly, mainly because its 12.5-inch refracting telescope was too small and had, by 1931, been dwarfed by 69-inch telescope present at the Perkins Observatory.)

He also helped forge an agreement between the Ohio State University, Ohio Wesleyan University and Lowell Observatory to move the Perkins Observatory's 69-inch reflecting telescope to Lowell in Flagstaff, Arizona. A 16-inch Schmidt telescope and a 32-inch reflector were donated to Perkins and replaced the 69-inch telescope. After its transfer, the telescope's optics were upgraded to a 72-inch mirror and it was used jointly by the two universities and the observatory. (Note: Perkins Observatory was already owned by Ohio Wesleyan University and jointly operated with the Ohio State University prior to the transfer.) It continued serving as the primary research instrument for Ohio State's astronomy department until 1998. (Note: In 1998, Ohio State ended its partnership with Ohio Wesleyan and Lowell Observatory, and the 72-inch mirror was sold to Lowell.)

Slettebak held another Fulbright fellowship for the 1974–75 academic year, this time at the University of Vienna. During his career, he also undertook visiting professorships in Vienna and Strasbourg. He was a councilor of the American Astronomical Society from 1964 to 1967 and served on several commissions of the International Astronomical Union, including as president of Commission 45 (Stellar Classification) from 1979 to 1982.

From 1961 to 1978, Slettebak represented Ohio State on the board of directors of the Association of Universities for Research in Astronomy, and was chair of its scientific committee between 1970 and 1973. He retired from the astronomy department in 1994, becoming professor emeritus. In 2015, the Ohio State University planetarium was renamed the Arne Slettebak Planetarium in honour of his legacy.

== Research ==
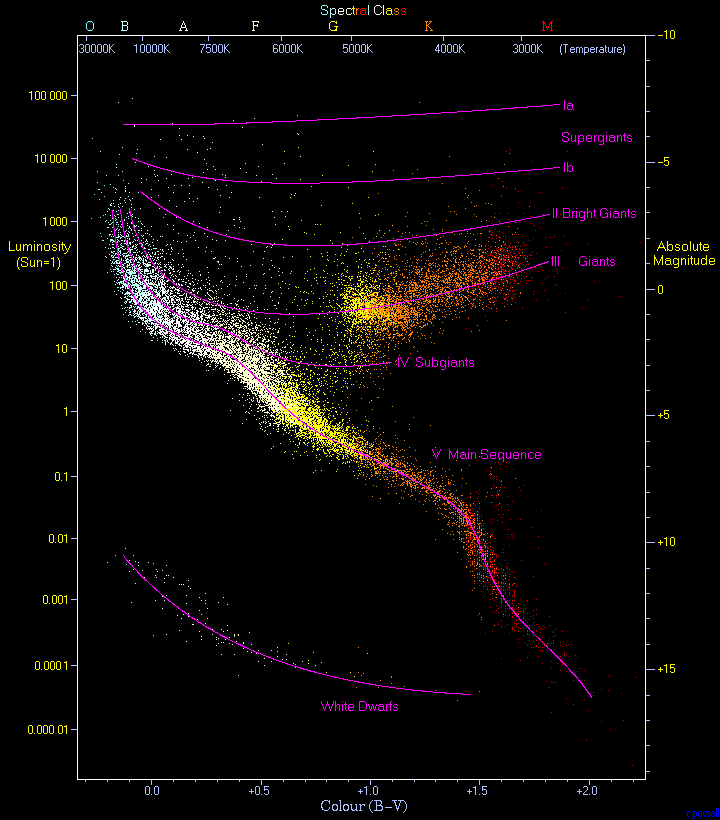
Slettebak found that the rotational velocities of stars along the main sequence (visible here as a prominent diagonal band from upper left to lower right) increase from low values in F-type stars to a maximum in B-type stars.

Slettebak's main research interests were stellar rotation, spectroscopy and the study of Be stars; for the latter subject, he organised multiple colloquia at the International Astronomical Union.

The topic of stellar rotation had been in a 'golden age' during the 1930s after Otto Struve and his collaborators provided conclusive observational evidence for axial rotation in single stars. However, after Pol Swings determined that the axial rotation of binary stars close to each other and with short periods tends to be approximately or perfectly synchronized with orbital motion, the field was abandoned for nearly 15 years.

After World War II, interest in measurements of stellar axial rotation was revitalised by Slettebak, who published a series of papers on the topic starting in 1949. He made extensive measurements of the rotational velocities of stars, initially making use of Struve and Grigory Shajn's graphical model during the 1950s and 60s, and subsequently with numerical models. One of his research projects was conducted jointly with Case Institute of Technology and sponsored by the Office of Naval Research.

Slettebak measured Be stars with axial rotational velocities of over 400–500 km/s, which averaged 150 km/s more than B-type stars as a class. He discovered groups of stars that had very low rotational velocities, and also found both that stars at a later stage of their life were slower than dwarf stars and that metallic-line stars had much smaller rotational velocities than average dwarf stars. Slettebak's data was used by Allan Sandage to show that the lower rotational velocities above the main sequence were consistent with theories of stellar evolution.

Later in his career, Slettebak compiled the main results of statistical studies on stellar rotation conducted between 1930 and 1970, determining that the distribution of rotational velocities for stars along the main sequence increases from low values in F-type stars to a maximum in B-type stars.

In 1955 and 1958, he conducted research in astronomical spectroscopy at the Mount Wilson and Palomar observatories in California. Slettebak remained active in research even after retirement, publishing the last of his more than 90 papers, abstracts and articles in 1998.

== Personal life and death ==
Slettebak married Constance Lorraine Pixler, a music graduate from the College of Wooster, on August 28, 1949; the couple had a daughter and a son. He died on May 20, 1999, at the age of 73 in Worthington, Ohio, after a brief illness. Pixler died in 2006 at the age of 82.
