= Perkins Observatory =

Astronomical observatory in Ohio, US

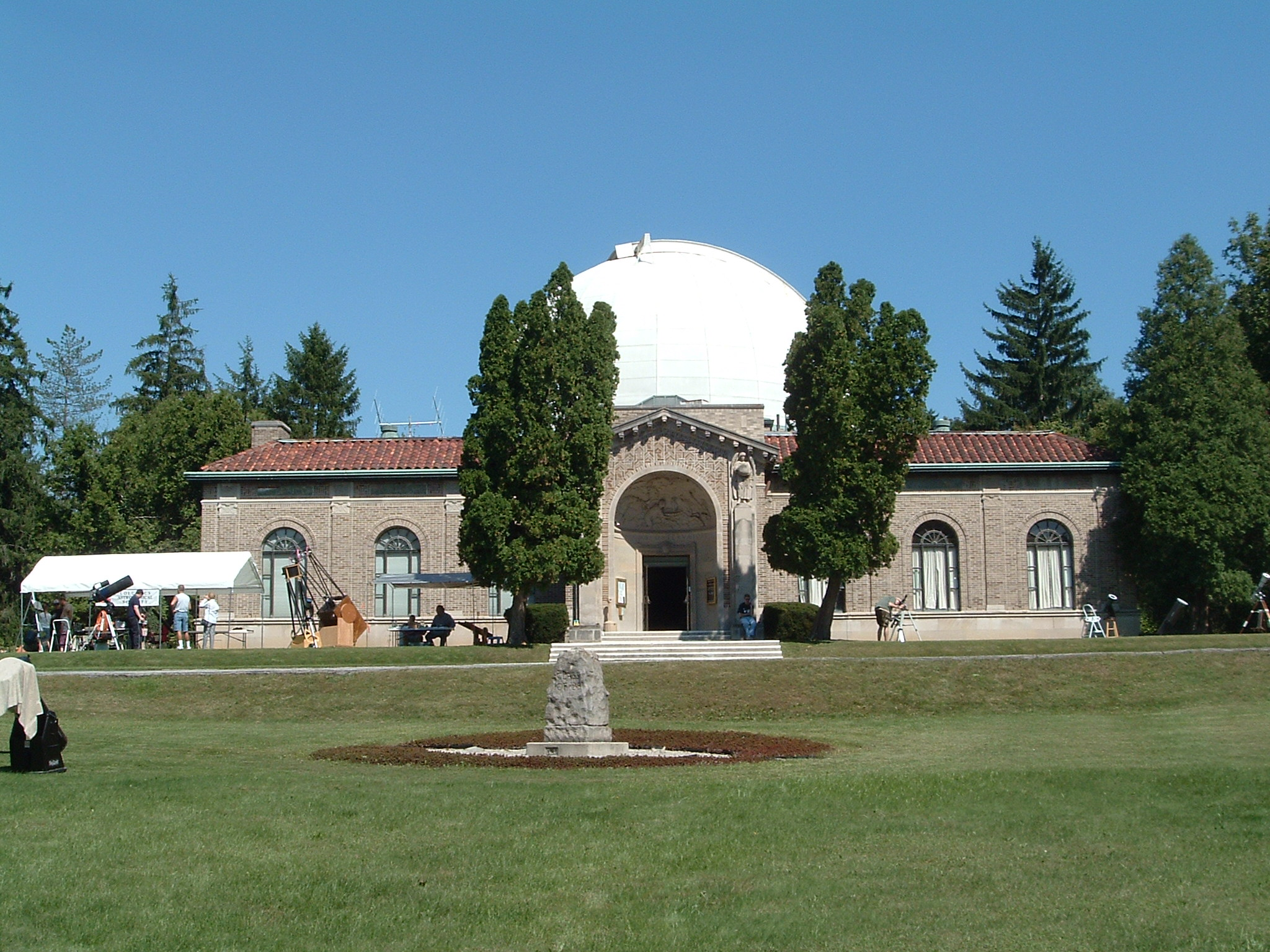
- Main facade
- Location: Delaware, Delaware County, Ohio
- Coordinates: 40°15′04″N 83°03′22″W

Perkins Observatory is an astronomical observatory in Delaware, Ohio, United States. It is owned and operated by Ohio Wesleyan University.

In 1931 it had the third largest telescope in the World; the 69 inch aperture Perkins telescope came online at this observatory. The mirror was the largest cast in the United States up to that time, and it was made by the United States National Bureau of Standards.

In the 1930s this observatory also started periodic document release called The Telescope, featuring results from the telescope but grew to include other astronomical information.

The University partnered with Ohio State University in 1935, to help run the big telescope and the agreement lasted for almost seven decades. In the 1960s the telescope was moved to Arizona, USA for better viewing conditions, and fitted with new larger mirror. Nevertheless, the Observatory continued to be a hub of astronomical activity in the region and for the University.

In the 21st century the Observatory supports various public and academic astronomical activities and is a source for information such as NEO flybys in the community.

== Early history ==
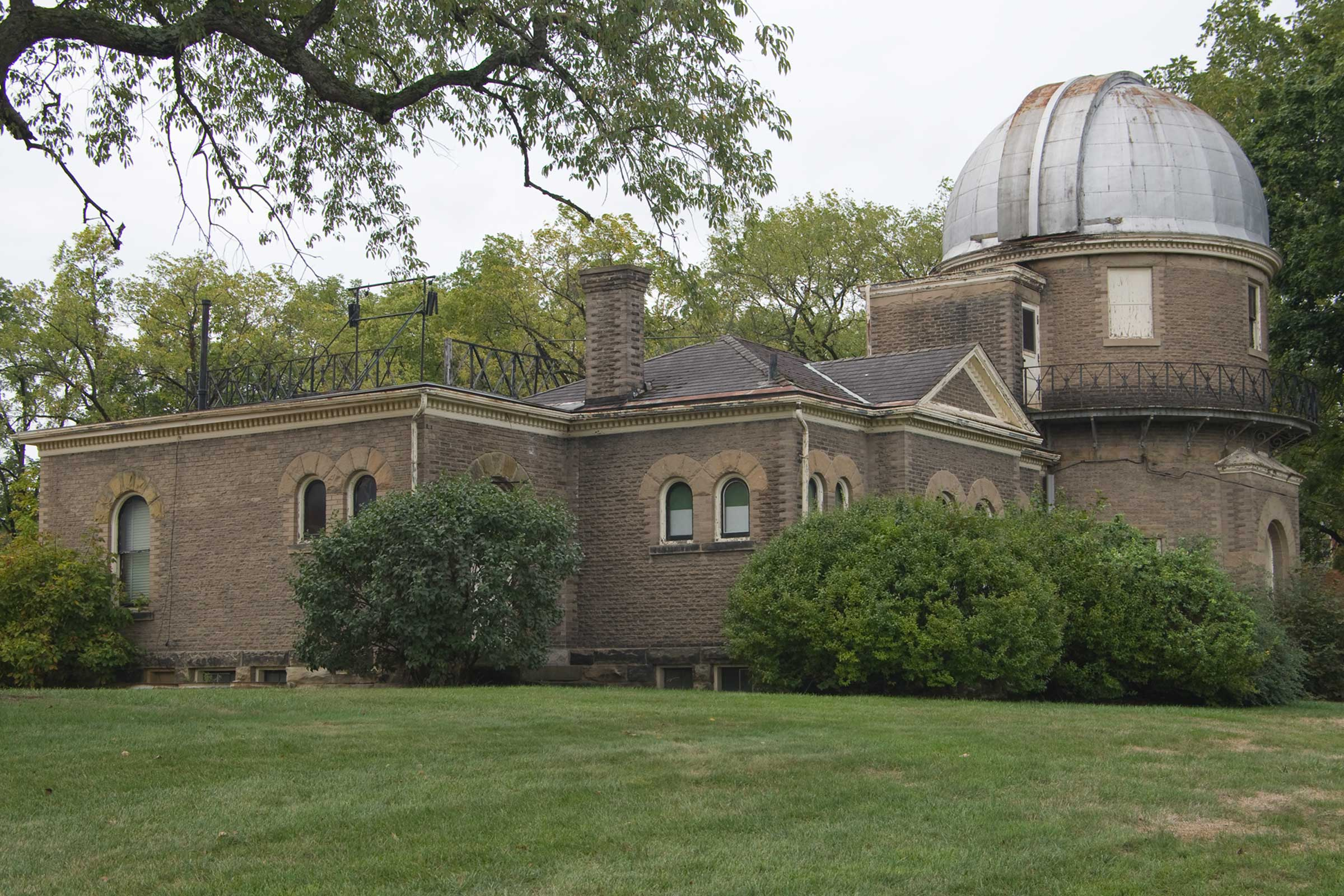
The old building (now Ohio Wesleyan University Student Observatory). It was here Perkins actually worked most of his career, as he had died by the time the new observatory was finished in the 1920s.

The observatory is named for Hiram Perkins, a professor of mathematics and astronomy at the Ohio Wesleyan University in Delaware, Ohio from 1857 to 1907. A devoutly religious Methodist and a man of deep convictions, he was also known as an uncompromising and demanding instructor. Perkins' believed that “The public should have an opportunity to see with a great telescope the objects such an instrument reveals and by so doing ‘Learn to love God and serve Him more acceptably.’"

Perkins graduated from Ohio Wesleyan in 1857, just nine years after the university was founded. He was immediately offered a position on the faculty. Shortly thereafter he married Caroline Barkdull, a graduate from OWU's Women's College.

In 1861 Perkins temporarily left OWU when the American Civil War began. He intended to enlist in the Union Army, but was deemed physically unfit for service. (At 6’4” tall and 97 pounds, his students referred to him as “the human skeleton.”) Perkins then returned to his family hog farm and worked to help feed the troops. (Salt pork was a staple military food at the time.) Applying his mathematical skills to the science of pork production, by war's end he had amassed an impressive (for the time) fortune. After the war Perkins returned to his university teaching position and lived a very frugal life on his small salary. Meanwhile, his shrewd business investments caused his fortune to multiply considerably.

In 1896 Professor Perkins donated the funds necessary to build the first of two observatories to bear his name. It is located on West William Street in Delaware, Ohio right next to Hiram and Caroline's former residence. This original “Perkins Astronomical Observatory” later had its name changed to “the Student Observatory” when the second Perkins Observatory was built a quarter century later.

Perkins's marriage never produced children. His older sister never married. Therefore, toward the end of his life Perkins realized he had no living relatives to whom to leave his fortune. Retiring in 1907, Professor Perkins applied himself to the creation of “an astronomical observatory of importance.” It was his desire that this second observatory be a place where cutting-edge research could be conducted. It took 15 years to find an appropriate location and secure the necessary funding (Perkins himself provided about $250,000, the equivalent of roughly $3.8 million dollars in 2019, of the approximately $350,000 budget).

Construction began in 1923 with the frail 90-year-old professor as Guest of Honor at the groundbreaking ceremony. Within a year, however, both Hiram and Caroline Perkins had died. Neither saw the completion of the new observatory.

The building features a reproduction of Robert Le Lorrain's (the original article in 'Popular Astronomy' misidentified him as Robert de Lorain) "Apollo Watering the Horses of the Sun" over the front entrance and a frieze of antique marble panels around the building bears the names of seventeen astronomers:

Pythagoras	Aristarchus	Eratosthenes	Hipparchus
Ptolemy	Copernicus	Tycho Brahe	Galileo
Kepler	Newton	Laplace	Herschel
Fraunhofer	Huggins	Newcomb	Kapteyn
Barnard

The building and telescope mount were completed in less than two years. The work was done by the Warner and Swasey Company of Cleveland, Ohio. (Warner and Swasey also built other observatories and telescopes, including Yerkes Observatory near Chicago, Theodore Jacobsen Observatory in Seattle, Washington, McCormick Observatory in Charlottesville, Virginia, and (of course) the Warner and Swasey Observatory in Cleveland, Ohio.) The building included a lecture room, library, office space, walk-in vault, small bedroom for visiting astronomers, and spacious work rooms and metal fabrication shops.

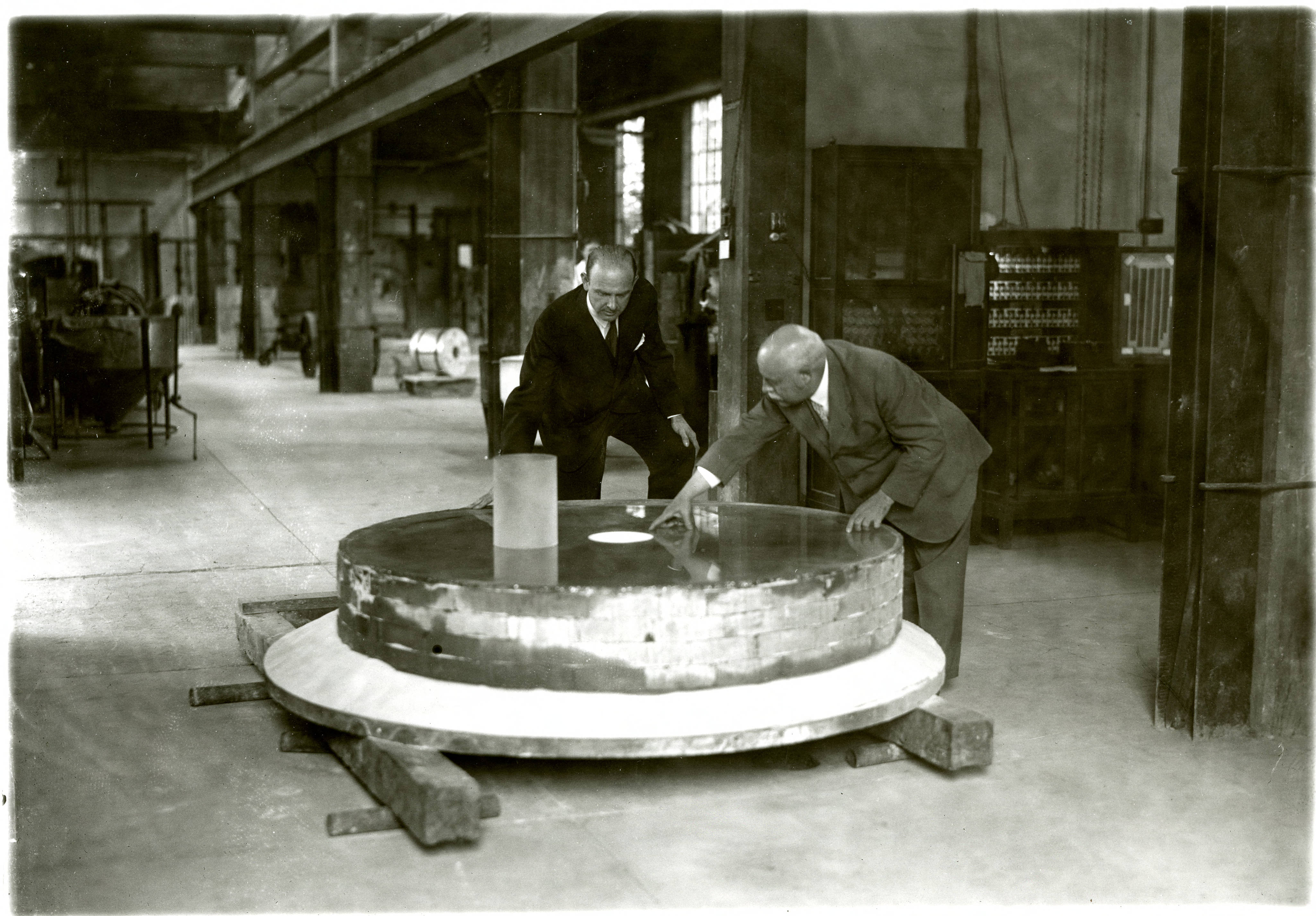
69 inch telescope lens being inspected by head of NBS and the Perkins Observatory

However, Professor Perkins had stipulated that the telescope mirror be cast in the United States. At this time no U.S. companies had experience in casting such a large mirror, so the National Bureau of Standards agreed to take on the project. It can be argued that casting of this mirror launched the optical glass industry in the United States.

The first four attempts to cast the mirror were unsuccessful. The fifth attempt, using a different technique, created a 69-inch (1.8 m) blank (somewhat larger than originally intended). Three years of grinding and polishing followed. When installed in the telescope mount in 1931, it was the third largest mirror in the world. (Prior to installation of the 69-inch (1.8 m) mirror, the observatory used a 60-inch (1.5 m) mirror on loan from Harvard University.)

== OSU era ==
Early on it became apparent that the Ohio Wesleyan University simply did not have the staff or expertise necessary to operate one of the world's most important observatories. In 1935 a cooperative agreement was reached with the Ohio State University in Columbus, Ohio to staff and operate Perkins Observatory. For the next 63 years, for most practical purposes, the observatory belonged to OSU.

The following three decades were Golden Years for Perkins Observatory. The remote skies were dark (if somewhat cloudy). Famous astronomers from around the world traveled to central Ohio to use the large telescope. Important meetings of professional and amateur astronomers were hosted on site. The library collection grew to include many rare volumes.

Astronomer Philip C. Keenan spent most of his professional life as an astronomer working at Perkins Observatory. (He was employed by the Ohio State University, not Ohio Wesleyan.) Using the 69-inch (1.8 m) telescope he spent almost 20 years taking spectrographic plates of vast areas of the night sky. In collaboration with William Wilson Morgan of Yerkes Observatory, Dr. Keenan helped to create the M-K System of Stellar Classification. (“M” is for Morgan and “K” is for Keenan.) This is the most common stellar classification system used by astronomers today.

In 1932 the Acting Director of the Observatory Nikolai T. Bobrovnikov began publication of a small in-house magazine known as “The Telescope.” At first this quarterly dealt primarily with research and current events related to Perkins Observatory, but in following issues it expanded its coverage of topics somewhat. In 1941 it merged with another small astronomy magazine known as “The Sky” to create “Sky & Telescope Magazine.”

Another stipulation in Hiram Perkins’ endowment was that observing sessions be open to the public at least once a month.

The radio telescope known as Big Ear was built on Perkins Observatory property and operated from 1963 to 1998. It was famous in part for its work on SETI and the WOW! Signal detected in 1977. This instrument was built and operated by the Ohio State University.

OSU had been given a 12.5 inch aperture refractor and observatory in 1895, the McMillin Observatory, however they gave the telescope away in the 1960s and razed the old observatory in 1976.

== Perkins - the difficult years ==
Central Ohio is not, as it turns out, a particularly good location for an astronomical research telescope. The low elevation and generally cloudy weather conspired to frustrate most astronomers using the 69-inch (1.8 m) telescope. More troublesome, the cities of Columbus, Ohio to the south and Delaware, Ohio to the north were both growing. Light pollution therefore became increasingly problematic. So in 1961 the Perkins Telescope was moved to Lowell Observatory in Flagstaff, Arizona.

Lowell is the largest private observatory (non-university or government affiliated) in the world. Through the end of the 20th century, the Perkins Telescope was the observatory's largest instrument. Observing time on this instrument was shared between Lowell astronomers and the Ohio State University.

The 69-inch (1.8 m) telescope at Perkins was immediately replaced with a 32-inch (810 mm) cassegrain reflector telescope. It was donated by Michael R. Schottland, an entrepreneur from Martinsville, Virginia. At that time it was the largest privately owned telescope in the United States. Currently it is one of the three largest telescopes in Ohio.

In 1964, three years after the Perkins Telescope arrived at Lowell Observatory, the 69-inch (1.8 m) mirror was replaced. A new 72-inch (1.8 m) mirror made of a more modern material was installed in the old mount. The old 69-inch (1.8 m) mirror was loaned to COSI in Columbus as an exhibit. (Eventually the 69 inch was returned to Perkins by the year 1999)

Part of the arrangement between OSU, OWU, and Lowell Observatory called for Ohio State to continue to fund operations at Perkins Observatory. This included maintaining the building, the library, and the monthly public programs. However, over the following decades, without a research instrument on site, interest in Perkins Observatory within the Ohio State University Astronomy Department declined. The on-site staff shrank until there was just a part-time secretary and a building superintendent who had only a small maintenance budget. Few of the observatory's Directors (employees of OSU) spent much time at the observatory. There was not even enough money in the budget to maintain subscriptions to prominent astronomy magazines for the Observatory's library.

For some years a small dome detached and separated from the main observatory building housed a 0.6-meter f1.8 Schmidt telescope. In 1990 this instrument was moved to Lowell Observatory and extensively refurbished using funding from NASA. In 1993 this new instrument came online as the LONEOS system to detect near-Earth asteroids. However, at the time Perkins Observatory received no compensation for use of this instrument.

At Ohio Wesleyan University, unfortunately, interest in Perkins Observatory also waned. Little concern was shown toward maintaining the historic property. An endowment fund of approximately $90,000 left by Hiram Perkins in his will (intended to fund observatory operations and the Director's salary) disappeared somewhere into the OWU's general endowment fund. Worst of all, most of the land surrounding the observatory was sold to developers. Of a sizable initial plot, by 1990 only 16 acres (65,000 m^{2}) remained. (A golf course was built on the sold off property, which later also swallowed up the Big Ear radio telescope.)

== Rebirth and reinvention ==
In the 1990s, Tom Burns, a member of the Columbus Astronomical Society and professor of English at the Ohio Wesleyan University, became Director of Perkins Observatory. He greatly expanded the Observatory's public programs and visibility in the central Ohio area.

A collaborative and mutually beneficial relationship was also established with the Columbus Astronomical Society. (In exchange for monthly meeting space and observatory access the CAS provides volunteer assistance with the many public programs.)

Major repairs to the observatory dome were undertaken, thanks to the profits made from the sale of eclipse viewing glasses for the 1994 solar eclipse. Unused office and storage space was converted into exhibit rooms, a children's play area and a small gift shop. In September 1999 the original 69-inch (1.8 m) telescope mirror was retrieved from COSI (where it had been sitting in a closet for over a decade) and placed on display.

In 1998 the Ohio State University formally ended its relationship with Ohio Wesleyan University and Perkins Observatory. OSU withdrew from the 1935 agreement so it could apply its financial resources to purchasing time on the Large Binocular Telescope on Mount Graham. The 72-inch (1.8 m) telescope was sold outright to Lowell Observatory by Ohio Wesleyan. (The proceeds of this sale went into the Perkins Observatory Endowment Fund.) Staff members who were technically Ohio State University employees started receiving their paychecks from OWU.

== Current use ==
Currently, regular observing programs are held almost every Friday and Saturday night throughout the year. Programs are held on other evenings and during the day by special appointment. A monthly lecture series detailing various current topics in astronomy is ongoing. Occasional special events (like telescope fairs, celebrity guest lecturers, and viewings of unusual astronomical events) are also sponsored and organized by Perkins. (Thousands of people visited the observatory to see comet Hale-Bopp in 1997. Each time a notable solar eclipse is visible from Central Ohio, several thousand pairs of eclipse glasses are distributed and educational school programs scheduled. Ed Krupp, Director of Griffith Observatory and John Dobson, inventor of the Dobsonian telescope, have both visited and lectured at Ohio Wesleyan thanks to Perkins sponsorship.)

Perkins Observatory is now the most visible and most reliable source of information related to astronomy and space exploration in central Ohio. Television stations, newspapers, other local science museums, and members of the general public rely on Professor Burns and his staff to answer questions, provide perspective, make media appearances and dispel astronomical misconceptions.

== Near-Earth object flyby ==
Simulated animation of the Moshup binary system

In 2019, Perkin Observatory was noted for pointing out the flyby of the Near-Earth asteroid 1999 KW4 (66391 Moshup) by a local radio station. They recommend viewing it with at least a 8-inch aperture telescope, and that it would be about 3 million miles away from the Earth during its flyby. The asteroid will not return until 2036.

== Challenges ==
Perkins Observatory faces many challenges as it begins the 21st Century.

Like many public institutions without government support, Perkins faces funding limitations. Although the Ohio Wesleyan University is very supportive, it cannot by itself provide adequate monies for staff, program expansion, or maintenance on the historic building. (An endowment fund has been established, and donations are accepted.)

Since the observatory was constructed 1923–1931, it experiences many maintenance challenges typical of older, historic buildings. Costly repairs and heating and cooling expenses eat into the limited budget. Also, handicapped accessibility was not a concern in the 1920s. Retrofitting the building for public use while keeping its unique architectural identity has proved to be difficult, costly, and time-consuming.

The most troublesome challenge that Perkins Observatory must now deal with is the increasing effect of light pollution. The city of Delaware is expanding from the north while Columbus expands from the south. Although lighting regulations exist which cover the surrounding area, enforcing compliance is a constant struggle. Observatory staff recognizes that the day is coming when observation of deep sky objects will no longer be possible from the site.

== The 69-inch Perkins of 1931 ==
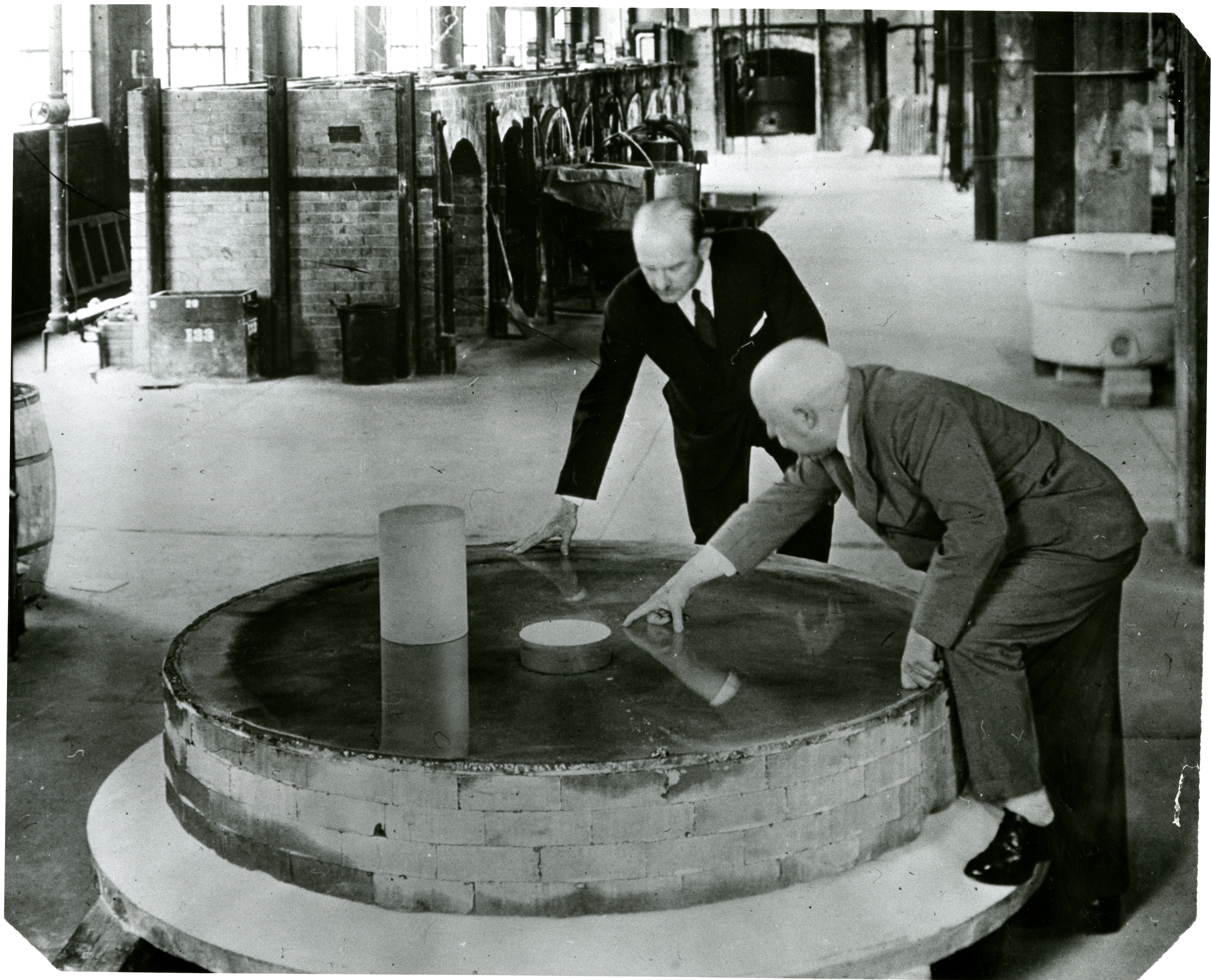
The 69 inch glass blank for the main mirror of the telescope

The 69-inch Perkins was the 3rd largest telescope in the World when it came online in 1931.

Contemporaries at first light

#	Name / Observatory	Image	Aperture	Altitude	First Light	Special advocate
1	Hooker Telescope; Mount Wilson Obs., United States		100 inch 254 cm	1742 m (5715 ft)	1917	George Ellery Hale; Andrew Carnegie
2	Plaskett telescope Dominion Astrophysical Obs., Canada		72 inch 182 cm	230 m (755 ft)	1918	John S. Plaskett
3	69-inch Perkins Telescope, United States		69 inch 175 cm		1931	Hiram Perkins

In 1961 the telescope was moved out from Perkins Observatory, and eventually the 69 inch mirror was put in a museum. The 69 inch was replaced with a new 72 inch mirror in the 1960s, which is why it was later called the 72 inch Perkins, not the 69 inch.

It was featured in a telescope exhibit at one point, but was eventually walled in a closet and thus not available for viewing. The mirror was returned to Perkins observatory by 1999, and was put on display. The mirror was the first large mirror cast in the United States and probably the third largest telescope mirror in the World when it came into use in 1931. The mirror blank weighed 3000 pounds and was cast in 1927 by the United States Bureau of Standards. It needed 8 months to cool properly.

The Perkins telescope, with the 72 inch mirror, was sold to Lowell Observatory in 1998. The evolved version of the Perkins is located at Anderson Mesa in Arizona, where it is now used by that Observatory and other universities.

== See also ==
- List of astronomical observatories
- List of largest optical telescopes in the 20th century
