= 335P/Gibbs =

Jupiter-family comet

Discovery
- Discovered by: Alex R. Gibbs
- Discovery date: 31 December 2008

Designations
- MPC designation: P/2008 Y2; P/2016 A9
- Alternative designations: Gibbs 8

Orbital characteristics
- Epoch: 21 November 2025 (JD 2461000.5)
- Observation arc: 14.48 years (Note: Observation arc from the Minor Planet Center database covering dates from 1 December 2008 until 27 May 2023.)
- Earliest precovery date: 1 December 2008
- Number of observations: 432
- Aphelion: 5.534 AU
- Perihelion: 1.620 AU
- Semi-major axis: 3.577 AU
- Eccentricity: 0.54700
- Orbital period: 6.765 years
- Inclination: 7.299°
- Longitude of ascending node: 330.79°
- Argument of periapsis: 162.33°
- Mean anomaly: 174.27°
- Last perihelion: 12 August 2022
- Next perihelion: 19 May 2029
- T_{Jupiter}: 2.833
- Earth MOID: 0.653 AU
- Jupiter MOID: 0.164 AU
- Comet total magnitude (M1): 17.0

335P/Gibbs is a periodic comet in the Solar System. It last came to perihelion in August 2022. Together with 266P/Christensen, it was proposed as the source of the 1977 "Wow! Signal", however this was later disproven by a follow-up study in 2020, where it was found out to be likely a maser-like flare from small hydrogen clouds in interstellar space instead.

== Notes ==
Numbered comets
Previous; 334P/NEAT	335P/Gibbs	Next; 336P/McNaught
