= QSO B1954+513 =

Quasar in the constellation of Cygnus

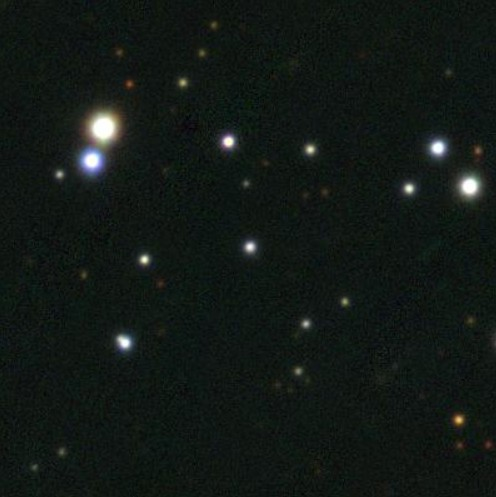
- The quasar QSO B1954+513.

Observation data (J2000 epoch)
- Constellation: Cygnus
- Right ascension: 19^{h} 55^{m} 42.73^{s}
- Declination: +51° 31′ 48.54″
- Redshift: 1.220000
- Heliocentric radial velocity: 365,747 km/s
- Distance: 8.533 Gly
- Apparent magnitude (V): 18.5

Characteristics
- Type: LPQ FSRQ

Other designations
- OV +591, TXS 1954+513, WMAP 051, RX J1955.6+5131, IRCF J195542.7+513148, 2MASS J19554274+5131487, CRATES J195542.73+513148.5, 1954+513

QSO B1954+513 is a quasar located in the constellation of Cygnus. It has a redshift of (z) 1.22 and it was first discovered by astronomers J.D. Kraus and M.R. Gearhart from the Ohio State University Radio Observatory in 1975. The radio spectrum of the source appears to be flat, making this a flat-spectrum radio quasar, but also has low polarization.

== Description ==
QSO B1954+513 is classified as a radio-loud quasar. It has an X-ray luminosity of 10^{43} erg s^{−1} and its optical spectrum has broad emission lines. The R and B magnitudes of the quasar are estimated to be 17.34 and 18.87 respectively. It is also a blazar mainly due to its X-ray, optical and radio characteristics. A gamma ray flare was detected in October 2020 by Large Area Telescope.

The source of QSO B1954+513 is found compact. It has a classical triple Fanaroff-Riley Class II radio structure made up of a radio core and two radio lobes which is orientated in a north to south direction. The source's extent is estimated to be 130 kiloparsecs. Radio imaging by Very Large Array at 5 GHz, showed it has a slightly elongated southern component towards the core. There is a faint extended component resolved by both VLBI Space Observatory Programme and Very Long Baseline Array 5 GHz image. This component is separated from the core by around 0.4 milliarcseconds with a position angle of -27°.

The jet of QSO B1954+513 is extended towards northwest direction. Based on observations, it measures at least 10 milliarcseconds in length at an 70° position angle. When shown on an image taken with Very Large Array (VLA), the jet is found connecting with the core towards north. At the end of the jet, there is an elongated knot made of two components. An image taken at 43 GHz showed the quasar has an inner jet which is resolved into 5 jet components. These components are found following a straight line which reaches at 1.3 milliarcseconds. There, the jet then subsequently bends into a jet component located at a -68° position angle. Polarized emission in the bending angle is present, suggesting the jet had interacted with an interstellar cloud which in turn changed the jet's direction.

QSO B1954+513 shows signs of rotation measure. Based on high frequency rotation-mapping by Very Long Baseline Array in March 2013, its rotation measure is found either inverted or faded out upon moving from the core region. H I absorption was also detected from the quasar at high ultraviolet luminosities indicating the survival of neutral hydrogen in active galactic nuclei.
