= Ferland =

Ferland may refer to:

== People ==
- Danielle Ferland (born 1971), American actress
- Gary Ferland (born 1951), American astrophysicist
- Guy Ferland (born 1966), American film and television director
- Jean-Baptiste-Antoine Ferland (1805–1865), Canadian historian
- Jean-Pierre Ferland (1934–2024), Canadian singer and songwriter
- Jodelle Ferland (born 1994), Canadian actress
- Jonathan Ferland (born 1983), Canadian ice hockey player
- Logan Ferland (born 1997), Canadian football player
- Luc Ferland, Canadian politician
- Marc Ferland (politician) (born 1942), Canadian politician
- Martin Ferland (born 1970), Canadian curler
- Ferland Mendy (born 1996), French footballer
- Micheal Ferland (born 1992), Canadian ice hockey player

== Places ==
- Ferland, Saskatchewan
- Ferland Airport, local airport in Ferland, Saskatchewan
