= Bautz =

Bautz is a surname. Notable people with this surname include:

- Christoph Bautz (born 1972), German biologist and activist
- Ekkehard Bautz (born 1933), German molecular biologist
- Erich Bautz (1913–1986), German racing cyclist
- Friedrich Wilhelm Bautz (1906–1979), German theologian
- Joseph Bautz (1843–1917), German Catholic priest
- Laura P. Bautz (1940–2014), also known as Pat Bautz, American astronomer, namesake of Bautz–Morgan classification
- Pat Bautz, American rock musician, drummer for Three Dog Night
