= Robert H. Gray =

American astronomer (1948–2021)

Robert Hansen Gray
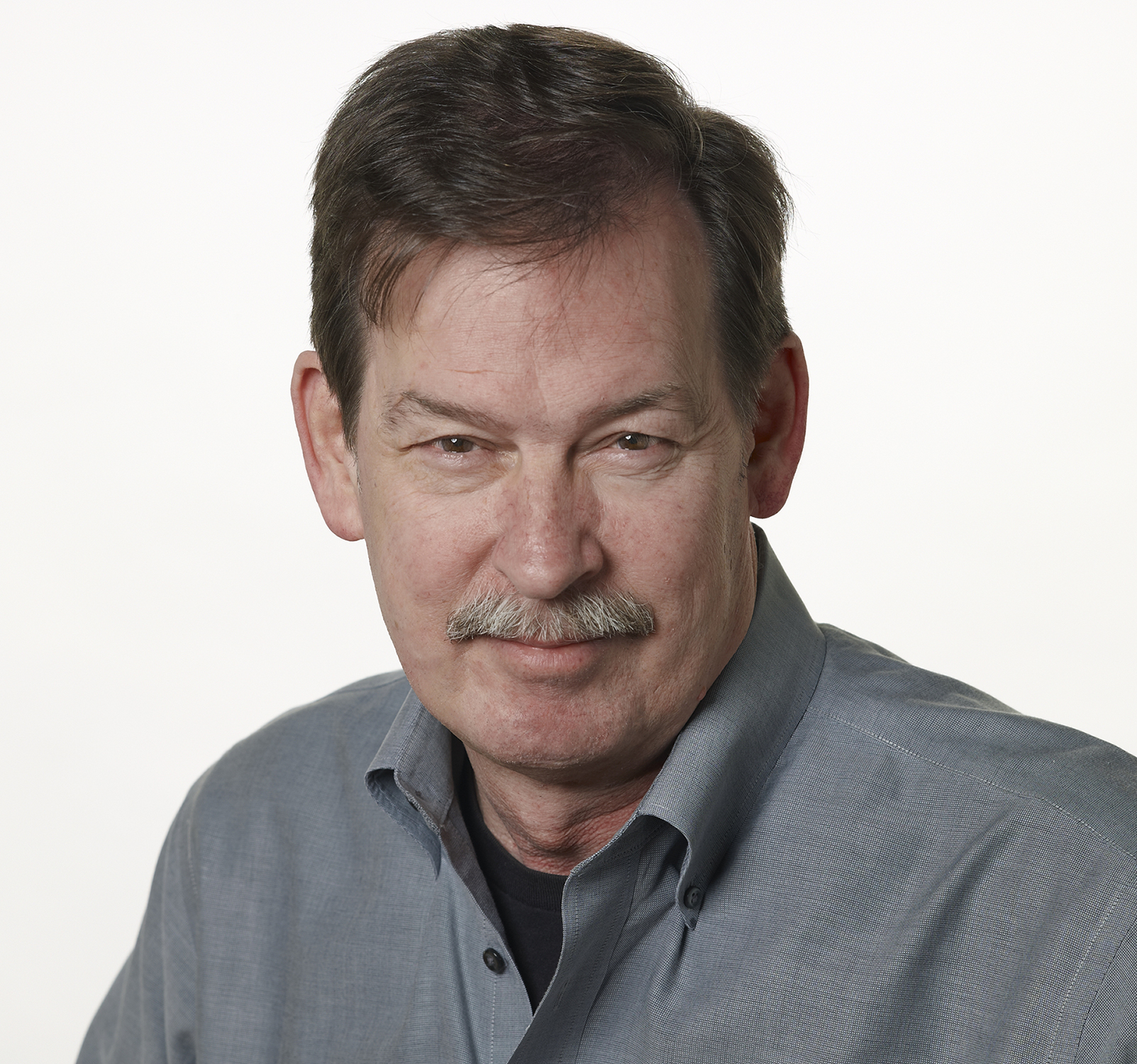
- Gray in 2012.
- Born: March 7, 1948; Fort Sill, Oklahoma
- Died: December 6, 2021 (aged 73); Chicago, Illinois
- Education: Shimer College; University of Illinois at Chicago
- Occupations: Data analyst, writer, astronomer
- Years active: 1982-2021
- Spouse: Sharon A. Hoogstraten

Robert Hansen Gray (March 7, 1948 - December 6, 2021) was an American data analyst, author, and astronomer, and author of The Elusive Wow: Searching for Extraterrestrial Intelligence.

== Education ==
Gray attended Shimer College, a Great Books school then located in Mount Carroll, Illinois, where he received a bachelor's degree in 1970. He went on to obtain a master's in urban planning and policy analysis from the University of Illinois at Chicago in 1980.

== Career ==
=== Data analysis ===
In 1984, Gray founded the company Gray Data in Chicago, which provided data analysis research services and published reference cards for microcomputer software. He continued to work as a data analyst through his company Gray Consulting.

=== Search for Extraterrestrial Intelligence (SETI) ===
Gray is best known for his work as an independent SETI researcher. The Atlantic called Gray "the 'Wow!' signal's most devoted seeker and chronicler, having traveled to the very ends of the earth in search of it."

The Wow! signal was detected by the Ohio State University Radio Observatory (also known as Big Ear) on August 15, 1977. The signal was so pronounced in the data, and so similar to a radio signal rather than a natural source, that SETI scientist Jerry R. Ehman circled it on the computer printout in red ink and wrote "Wow!" next to it. After hearing about the Wow! signal a few years after its detection, Gray contacted the Ohio team, visited Big Ear, and spoke with Ehman, Robert S. Dixon (director of the SETI project) and John D. Kraus (the telescope's designer).

In 1980, Gray began scanning the skies from his backyard in Chicago, using a 12-foot commercial telecommunications dish. He operated his small SETI radio observatory regularly beginning in 1983 and for the next 15 years, but did not find a trace of the Wow! signal. In 1987 and 1989 he led searches for the signal using the Harvard/Smithsonian META radio telescope at the Oak Ridge Observatory in Harvard, Massachusetts. In September 1995 and again in May 1996, Gray and Kevin B. Marvel reported searches for the signal using the Very Large Array (VLA) radio telescope in New Mexico (which is an array of 27 dishes simulating a single dish with a diameter of up to 22 miles), becoming the first amateur astronomer to use the VLA, and the first individual to use it to search for extraterrestrial signals. The VLA was, until the end of the twentieth century, the most powerful radio telescope ever built. In 1998, he and University of Tasmania professor Simon Ellingsen conducted searches using the 26-meter dish at the Mount Pleasant Radio Observatory in Hobart, Tasmania. Gray and Ellingsen made six 14-hour observations where the Big Ear was pointing when it found the Wow! signal, searching for intermittent and possibly periodic signals, rather than a constant signal. No signals resembling the Wow! were detected.

=== Writing ===
Gray and Marvel published a 2001 paper in The Astrophysical Journal detailing his use of the VLA in search of the signal. Gray and Ellingsen published "A Search for Periodic Emissions at the Wow Locale" in the October 2002 issue of The Astrophysical Journal, reporting on searches for the Wow! signal. In 2011, Gray published the book The Elusive Wow: Searching for Extraterrestrial Intelligence, summarizing what is known about the Wow! signal, covering his own search for the signal, and offering an overview of the search for extraterrestrial intelligence.

In 2016, Gray published an article in Scientific American about the Fermi paradox, which claims that if extraterrestrials existed, we would see signs of them on Earth, because they would certainly colonize the galaxy by interstellar travel. Gray argued that the Fermi paradox, named after Nobel Prize-winning physicist Enrico Fermi, does not accurately represent Fermi's views. Gray stated that Fermi questioned the feasibility of interstellar travel, but did not say definitively whether or not he thought extraterrestrials exist.

== Personal life ==
Gray lived in Chicago, Illinois, with his wife, photographer Sharon A. Hoogstraten. He died on December 6, 2021, from complications from lung cancer in Chicago.

== Bibliography ==
=== Books ===
- Robert H. Gray, The Elusive Wow: Searching for Extraterrestrial Intelligence (Palmer Square Press, 2012)

=== Articles ===
- "A VLA Search for the Ohio State 'Wow'" The Astrophysical Journal, vol. 546, no. 2, January 2001 (with Kevin B. Marvel)
- "A Search for Periodic Emissions at the Wow Locale" The Astrophysical Journal, vol. 578, no. 2, October 2002 (with Simon Ellingsen)
- "A VLA Search for Radio Signals from M31 and M33" The Astrophysical Journal, vol. 153, no. 3, February 2017 (with Kunal Mooley)
- "An ATA Search for a Repetition of the Wow Signal" The Astrophysical Journal, vol. 160, no. 4, September 2020 (with Gerald Harp, Jon Richards, Seth Shostak, and Jill Tarter)
- "The Fermi Paradox Is Not Fermi's, and It Is Not a Paradox" Scientific American, January 29, 2016 (first appeared in Astrobiology, vol. 15, issue 3, March 2015)
- "The Extended Kardashev Scale" Astronomical Journal, vol. 159, no. 5, April 2020
- "Intermittent Signals and Planetary Days in SETI" Intl. Journal of Astrobiology, vol. 19, April 2020
