= Bruce Medal =

Award for contribution to astronomy

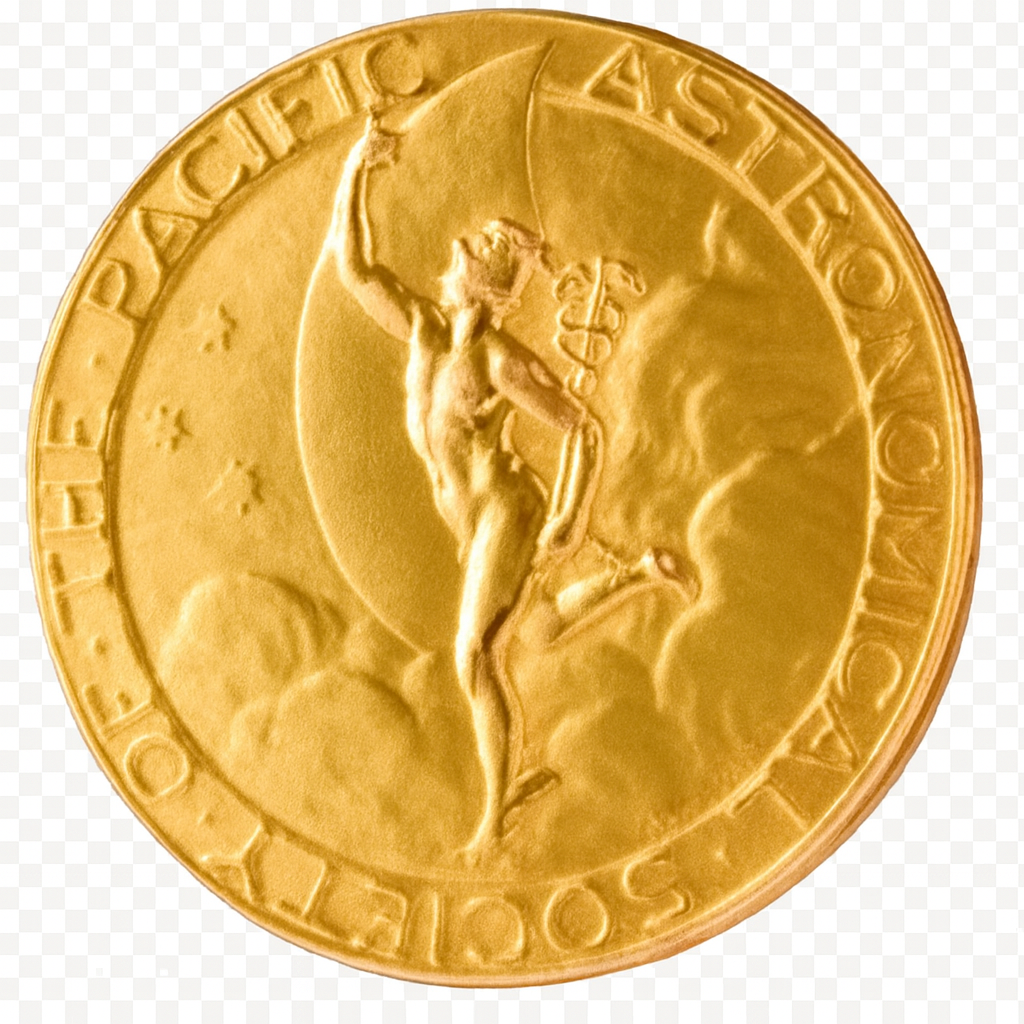
The Bruce Gold Medal, instituted in 1898 by the Astronomical Society of the Pacific

The Catherine Wolfe Bruce Gold Medal, commonly known as the Bruce Medal, is an annual award presented by the Astronomical Society of the Pacific in recognition of lifetime contributions to astronomy. The award was established in 1898 through a donation from American philanthropist and astronomy patron Catherine Wolfe Bruce.

The Bruce Medal is widely regarded as a major lifetime-achievement award in astronomy. Astronomy magazine has described it as "one of the most prestigious awards in the field." The NASA Webb Telescope Team noted that "The Catherine Wolfe Bruce Gold Medal is the organization’s highest award given annually to a professional astronomer in recognition of a lifetime of outstanding achievement and contributions to astrophysics research."

== History ==
The Astronomical Society of the Pacific was founded in March 1889, one year after the founding of Lick Observatory (1888).

Edward S. Holden, the Society's first president and the director of Lick Observatory, proposed establishing a medal to honor "astronomical work of the highest class." He argued that such an award would enhance the Society's reputation and influence. Catherine Wolfe Bruce (1816–1900) became the benefactor who turned this vision into reality by endowing the medal in 1898, nine years after the Astronomical Society of the Pacific was founded.

Harvard College Observatory director Edward C. Pickering drafted the original statutes governing the medal on behalf of Miss Bruce. The directors of six observatories—three in the United States and three abroad—would nominate one to three candidates "worthy to receive the medal". The award was open regardless of gender or nationality.

== Bruce's Legacy ==
Catherine Wolfe Bruce was the heir to a New York family fortune originally from a type foundry and later real estate investments. She supported astronomical projects at several observatories, including the Dudley Observatory in New York, the Heidelberg Observatory in Germany, and the Yerkes Observatory in the United States. Between 1889 and 1899, she made more than fifty donations totaling over US$275,000, helping to fund instrumentation and expand research capabilities at major observatories.

== Notable recipients ==
The Bruce Medal has been awarded to more than a hundred astronomers since 1898. Simon Newcomb (1898), considered the leading American astronomer at the time, received the first award. Arthur Eddington (1924) was acknowledged for his work on stellar structure and the 1919 eclipse expedition that confirmed Einstein's general theory of relativity. Edwin Hubble (1938) for the discoveries that our galaxy is just one of many and that external galaxies appear to be receding at velocities proportional to their distances. Henry Norris Russell (1925) and Ejnar Hertzsprung (1937) were recognized for developing the Hertzsprung–Russell diagram, the foundation of modern stellar astrophysics.

Other recipients include Harlow Shapley (1939), who measured the size of the Milky Way and located the solar system's position within it, Fred Hoyle (1970) for his work on cosmology and nucleosynthesis, Hans Bethe (2001) for his contributions to understanding how stars produce energy and Edwin Salpeter (1987) for his work on stellar populations and galaxy evolution, including the formulation of the Salpeter initial mass function..

Subsequent laureates include Martin Rees (1993), Britain's Astronomer Royal and former president of the Royal Society, recognized for his extensive contributions to cosmology; Donald Lynden-Bell (1998), a pioneering theoretical astrophysicist who advanced understanding of galactic dynamics, supermassive black holes, and quasars; Vera Rubin (2003), whose measurements of galaxy rotation curves provided some of the first strong evidence for the existence of dark matter; and Andrew Fabian (2016), a leading figure in X-ray and extragalactic astrophysics.

More recent laureates include Marcia J. Rieke (2023) for her pioneering work in infrared astronomy and her leadership of the Near-Infrared Camera (NIRCam) on the James Webb Space Telescope; Chryssa Kouveliotou (2024), honored for her contributions to high-energy astrophysics and the identification of soft gamma repeaters as magnetars; and Gary J. Ferland (2025), cited for creating and developing the Cloudy spectral simulation code, which is widely used in the interpretation of astrophysical spectra.

Several Bruce Medalists have also gone on to receive the Nobel Prize in Physics. The 1983 Nobel Prize was shared by Subrahmanyan Chandrasekhar (1952), for work on stellar structure and evolution, and William Alfred Fowler (1979), for studies of nuclear reactions in stars. Martin Ryle (1974) received the 1974 Prize for contributions to radio astronomy and Riccardo Giacconi (1981) was awarded the Prize in 2002 for work in X-ray astronomy.

== List of Bruce Medalists ==
Source: Astronomical Society of the Pacific

- 1898 – Simon Newcomb
- 1899 – Arthur Auwers
- 1900 – David Gill
- 1902 – Giovanni V. Schiaparelli
- 1904 – William Huggins
- 1906 – Hermann Carl Vogel
- 1908 – Edward C. Pickering
- 1909 – George William Hill
- 1911 – Henri Poincaré
- 1913 – Jacobus C. Kapteyn
- 1914 – Oskar Backlund
- 1915 – William Wallace Campbell
- 1916 – George Ellery Hale
- 1917 – Edward Emerson Barnard
- 1920 – Ernest W. Brown
- 1921 – Henri A. Deslandres
- 1922 – Frank W. Dyson
- 1923 – Benjamin Baillaud
- 1924 – Arthur Stanley Eddington
- 1925 – Henry Norris Russell
- 1926 – Robert G. Aitken
- 1927 – Herbert Hall Turner
- 1928 – Walter S. Adams
- 1929 – Frank Schlesinger
- 1930 – Max Wolf
- 1931 – Willem de Sitter
- 1932 – John S. Plaskett
- 1933 – Carl V.L. Charlier
- 1934 – Alfred Fowler
- 1935 – Vesto M. Slipher
- 1936 – Armin O. Leuschner
- 1937 – Ejnar Hertzsprung
- 1938 – Edwin P. Hubble
- 1939 – Harlow Shapley
- 1940 – Frederick H. Seares
- 1941 – Joel Stebbins
- 1942 – Jan H. Oort
- 1945 – E. Arthur Milne
- 1946 – Paul Merrill
- 1947 – Bernard Lyot
- 1948 – Otto Struve
- 1949 – Harold Spencer Jones
- 1950 – Alfred H. Joy
- 1951 – Marcel Minnaert
- 1952 – Subrahmanyan Chandrasekhar
- 1953 – Harold D. Babcock
- 1954 – Bertil Lindblad
- 1955 – Walter Baade
- 1956 – Albrecht Unsöld
- 1957 – Ira S. Bowen
- 1958 – William Wilson Morgan
- 1959 – Bengt Strömgren
- 1960 – Viktor A. Ambartsumian
- 1961 – Rudolph Minkowski
- 1962 – Grote Reber
- 1963 – Seth Barnes Nicholson
- 1964 – Otto Heckmann
- 1965 – Martin Schwarzschild
- 1966 – Dirk Brouwer
- 1967 – Ludwig Biermann
- 1968 – Willem J. Luyten
- 1969 – Horace W. Babcock
- 1970 – Fred Hoyle
- 1971 – Jesse Greenstein
- 1972 – Iosif S. Shklovskii
- 1973 – Lyman Spitzer Jr.
- 1974 – Martin Ryle
- 1975 – Allan R. Sandage
- 1976 – Ernst J. Öpik
- 1977 – Bart J. Bok
- 1978 – Hendrik C. van de Hulst
- 1979 – William A. Fowler
- 1980 – George Herbig
- 1981 – Riccardo Giacconi
- 1982 – E. Margaret Burbidge
- 1983 – Yakov B. Zel'dovich
- 1984 – Olin C. Wilson
- 1985 – Thomas G. Cowling
- 1986 – Fred L. Whipple
- 1987 – Edwin E. Salpeter
- 1988 – John G. Bolton
- 1989 – Adriaan Blaauw
- 1990 – Charlotte E. Moore Sitterly
- 1991 – Donald E. Osterbrock
- 1992 – Maarten Schmidt
- 1993 – Martin Rees
- 1994 – Wallace Sargent
- 1995 – P. James E. Peebles
- 1996 – Albert E. Whitford
- 1997 – Eugene Parker
- 1998 – Donald Lynden-Bell
- 1999 – Geoffrey R. Burbidge
- 2000 – Rashid A. Sunyaev
- 2001 – Hans A. Bethe
- 2002 – Bohdan Paczyński
- 2003 – Vera C. Rubin
- 2004 – Chūshirō Hayashi
- 2005 – Robert Kraft
- 2006 – Frank J. Low
- 2007 – Martin Harwit
- 2008 – Sidney van den Bergh
- 2009 – Frank H. Shu
- 2010 – Gerry Neugebauer
- 2011 – Jeremiah P. Ostriker
- 2012 – Sandra M. Faber
- 2013 – James E. Gunn
- 2014 – Kenneth Kellermann
- 2015 – Douglas N. C. Lin
- 2016 – Andrew Fabian
- 2017 – Nick Scoville
- 2018 – Tim Heckman
- 2019 – Martha P. Haynes
- 2020 – Prize suspended due to COVID-19 pandemic
- 2021 – Bruce Elmegreen
- 2022 – Ellen Gould Zweibel
- 2023 – Marcia J. Rieke
- 2024 – Chryssa Kouveliotou
- 2025 – Gary Ferland
- 2026 – Steve Bruce Howell

== See also ==
- List of astronomy awards
- Prizes named after people
- Sonoma State's Directory
