= Simon Ellingsen =

Australian physicist and astronomer

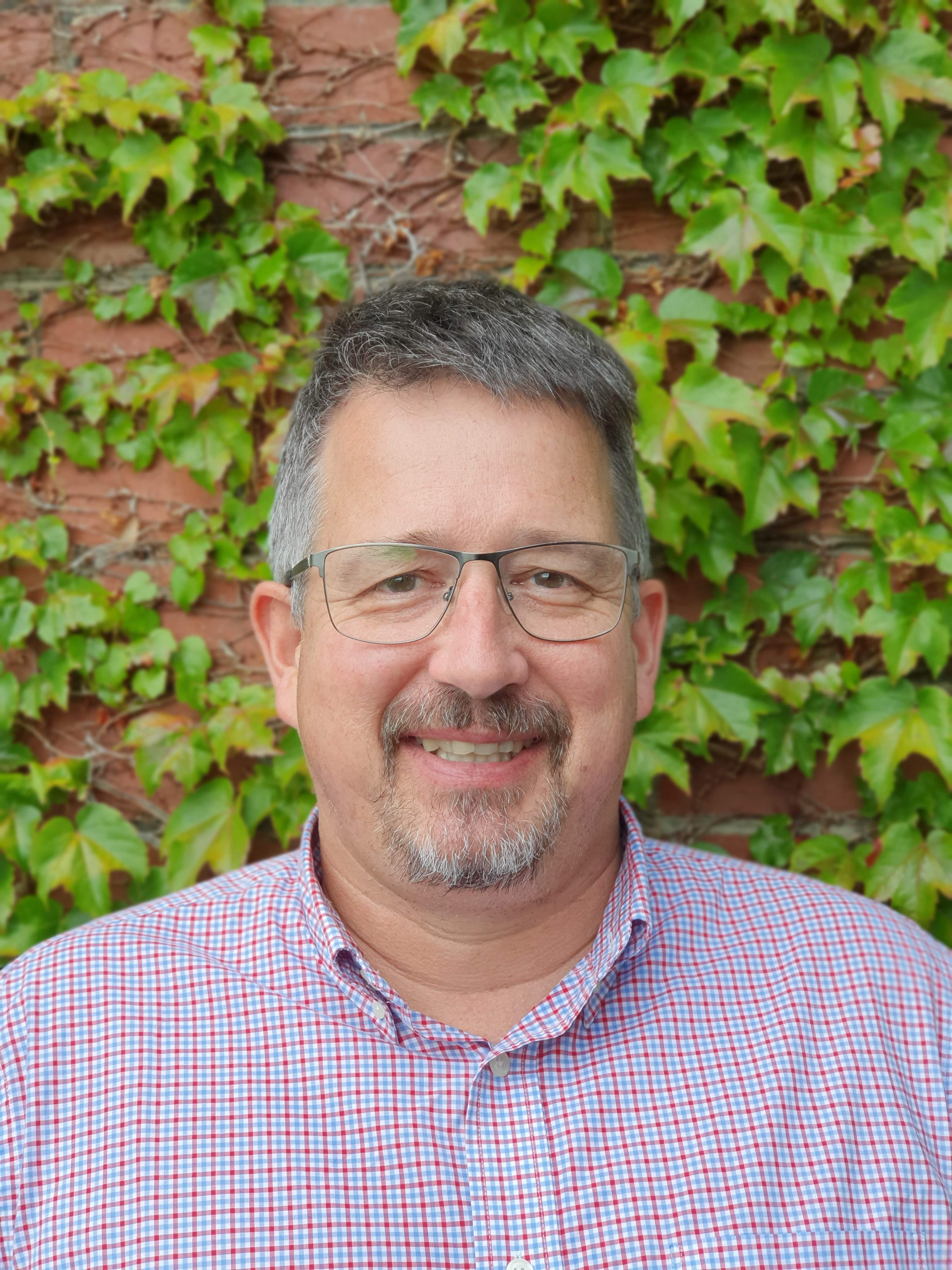
- Ellingsen in 2020
- Born: 1969 (age 56–57)
- Education: University of Tasmania
- Occupations: Physicist, Astronomer
- Years active: 1991-present
- Website: https://www.icrar.org/people/sellingsen/

Simon Ellingsen is an Executive Director of the International Centre for Radio Astronomy Research (ICRAR) and is based at the University of Western Australia node.

== Education ==
Ellingsen attended University of Tasmania, located in Hobart, Tasmania, where he received a Bachelor's degree (First-class honours) in 1991. He went on to obtain a PhD in 1996, with the thesis "Class II Methanol Masers in Star Formation Regions"

== Career ==
Ellingsen is best known for his work on star formation and the structure of the Milky Way, particularly through observations of methanol masers. Notable contributions include the first unbiased search for 6.7 GHz methanol masers, which identified a large number of previously unknown regions of high-mass star formation, discovery of a number of new interstellar methanol maser transitions and the demonstration that class II methanol masers trace a very early phase of high-mass star formation. He has used observations of methanol absorption to help constrain changes in the proton-to-electron mass ratio and made the first detection of extragalactic class I methanol and HC_{3}N masers toward NGC253. He continues to work as a researcher at the University of Tasmania.

Ellingsen has contributed to efforts to locate the Wow! signal with American data analyst, astronomer, and author Robert H. Gray. In 1998 Ellingsen and Gray conducted searches using the 26-meter dish at the Mount Pleasant Radio Observatory in Hobart, Tasmania. Gray and Ellingsen made six 14-hour observations where the Big Ear was pointing when it found the Wow! Signal. Gray and Ellingsen published "A Search for Periodic Emissions at the Wow Locale" in the October 2002 issue of The Astrophysical Journal, reporting on searches for the Wow! signal.

Ellingsen had a number of roles at the University of Tasmania. Ellingsen has been involved in running research facilities and associated projects at The University of Tasmania for many years, most recently a Space Infrastructure Fund grant to construct a new satellite tracking antenna at the Greenhill Observatory. Ellingsen was appointed as a lecturer in physics in 2000, promoted to senior lecturer in 2005, to Associate Professor in 2010 and to Professor in 2015. He was Head of Discipline for Physics from 2015 – 2019, becoming Acting Head of School for the School of Natural Sciences in July 2019 and was appointed to the position of Dean of Natural Sciences in November 2020. In April 2024 he commenced as the Executive Director for the International Centre for Radio Astronomy Research (ICRAR) and is based at the University of Western Australia node.
