= Pat Bautz =

Pat Bautz may refer to:

- Laura P. Bautz (1940–2014), also known as Pat Bautz, American astronomer
- Pat Bautz, American rock musician, drummer for Three Dog Night
