= Gary Ferland =

American astrophysicist

Gary J. Ferland
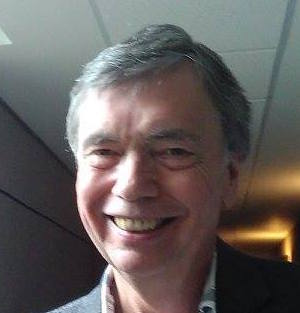
- Ferland in 2016
- Born: Gary Joseph Ferland; May 10, 1951 (age 75); Washington D.C., US
- Education: University of Texas (B.S., Ph.D.)
- Awards: Catedratico de Excelencia Guillermo Haro, (2016); AAS Fellow; AAAS Fellow; RAS Fellow; Bruce Medal (2025)
- Scientific career
- Fields: Astrophysics
- Workplaces: Institute of Astronomy, Cambridge; University of Kentucky
- Thesis: Spectroscopic Observations of Nova V1500 Cygni (1978)
- Doctoral advisor: David L. Lambert; Gregory Shields
- Website: pa.as.uky.edu/users/gary/

Gary Joseph Ferland (born May 10, 1951, in Washington D.C.) is an American astrophysicist. He is a professor of Physics and Astronomy at the University of Kentucky. He is best known for developing the astrophysical simulation code Cloudy, for his work on physical processes in ionized plasmas, and investigations of the chemical evolution of the cosmos.

== Biography ==
He joined the University of Texas Astronomy Department in 1973 where he received his Ph.D. in 1978, studying the 1975 explosion of V1500 Cygni at McDonald Observatory. From 1978 to 1980 he was at the Institute of Astronomy, Cambridge where he worked with Martin Rees on International Ultraviolet Explorer observations of radio galaxies. He joined the faculty of the University of Kentucky in 1980. The American Astronomical Society's Astronomy Genealogy Project lists the 18 PhDs he has supervised.

Ferland is a Fellow of the American Astronomical Society, and has served on their Governing Council in addition to their Publications Board. He was named Fellow of the American Association for the Advancement of Science in 2023 and is a Fellow of the Royal Astronomical Society. He is a long-time member of the International Astronomical Union where he was on the Organizing Committee of Division VI (2003–2009) and Commission 34 (2006–2012) Interstellar Matter.

His research involves the interactions between light and matter, especially how the photons we receive can tell us about events at the edges of the Universe. He has also studied such diverse environments as the interstellar medium, planetary nebulae, H II region, photodissociation regions, and Active Galactic Nuclei. His discovery of a tidal disruption event in the Seyfert galaxy NGC 548 was listed by Science News as one of the top ten discoveries in astronomy in 1986.

He is best known as a developer of the open-source spectral simulation code Cloudy, a project he started at Cambridge in 1978. The code uses large databases of atomic, molecular and interstellar grain cross sections and rate coefficients to determine the physical state of a non-equilibrium plasma, the emission or absorption properties of Interstellar clouds, and predict the observed spectrum. Cloudy helps to understand the emission and absorption spectra of plasmas and to interpret observational data from various astrophysical sources. Nature Astronomy named Cloudy their first Code of honour in their Access Code series.

He has edited two books in addition to more than 700 articles on astronomy and astrophysics. He is a co-author on the influential 2006 textbook Astrophysics of Gaseous Nebulae and Active Galactic Nuclei, written with Donald E. Osterbrock of Lick Observatory and the University of California, Santa Cruz.

A noted science communicator, Ferland has given popular-level talks at the Smithsonian Institution, the Cleveland Museum of Natural History, and numerous clubs, organizations, and classes across the Bluegrass region.

== Honors and awards ==
Ferland was identified as the most frequently acknowledged astronomer worldwide in the 1992 *Astronomy Acknowledgements Index*. In 2016 he received the Catedrático de Excelencia Guillermo Haro from the National Institute of Astrophysics, Optics and Electronics in Mexico. That same year, colleagues organized a Festschrift in his honor at the National Autonomous University of Mexico in Mexico City.

In recognition of his contributions to astrophysics, Ferland was elected a Fellow of the American Astronomical Society in 2021 and of the American Association for the Advancement of Science in 2022, with both organizations citing his development of the Cloudy spectral simulation code. In 2025, he was awarded the Catherine Wolfe Bruce Gold Medal by the Astronomical Society of the Pacific, “in recognition of a lifetime of outstanding achievement and contributions to astrophysics research,” highlighting his leadership in quantitative spectroscopy and creation of the groundbreaking ionization and thermal synthesis code *Cloudy*, which has been instrumental in accurately predicting the chemical, physical, and radiative conditions in a wide range of gaseous nebulae ... According to NASA’s Astrophysics Data System (ADS), Ferland has a normalized citation count of approximately 9,900; studies of citation distributions in astronomy indicate that citation counts at this level are attained by only the uppermost fraction of a percent of researchers in the field.

== Visiting positions ==
Ferland has held a number of honorary visiting appointments at institutions worldwide:

- At University of Cambridge
  - Staff Member, Institute of Astronomy, 1978–1980
  - Senior Visiting Fellow, 1987, 1990, 2007–2008, 2022
  - Sackler Visiting Fellow, 2007–2008
  - Visiting Associate, Darwin College, 2007–2008
  - Kavli Visiting Fellowship, DAMTP (Applied Mathematics and Theoretical Physics), 2019
- At Queen's University Belfast
  - Distinguished Visiting Fellowship, Centre for Experimental Physics, 2002–2005
  - Leverhulme Professor, 2014–2015
  - Visiting Research Professor, School of Mathematics and Physics, 2017–2018
- Other institutions
  - Visiting Fellow, Joint Institute for Laboratory Astrophysics, University of Colorado Boulder, 1990–1991
  - Visiting Astronomer, Cerro Tololo Inter-American Observatory, La Serena, Chile, 1992–1993
  - Visiting Professor, Canadian Institute for Theoretical Astrophysics, University of Toronto, 1998–1999
  - Visiting Astronomer, Nicolaus Copernicus Astronomical Center, Warsaw, Poland, 2015

== Personal life ==
Ferland was the son of Andrew Joseph Ferland, a career officer in the United States Air Force, and Ida Marie Schneemann. He was raised in Washington D.C., the Panama Canal Zone, Alaska, Florida, and Texas, where he received a BS in Physics with Special Honors in 1972 at the University of Texas.

He married Ann Elizabeth Clemmens (1952–) in 1983. They have two children.

== Books ==
- Ferland, Gary J.; Savin, Daniel Wolf (2001). Spectroscopic Challenges of Photoionized Plasmas. Astronomical Society of the Pacific. ISBN 1-58381-085-4.
- Ferland, Gary J.; Baldwin, Jack (1999). Quasars and Cosmology. Astronomical Society of the Pacific. ISBN 1-886733-83-X.
- Osterbrock, Donald; Ferland, Gary (2006). Astrophysics of gaseous nebulae and active galactic nuclei (2 ed.). Sausilito: University Science Books. p. 480. ISBN 978-1-891389-34-4.

== Named after him ==
- The asteroid (30521) Garyferland (provisional designation 2001 MU14) was named in his honor.
