= Peter Quinn (astronomer) =

Australian astronomer

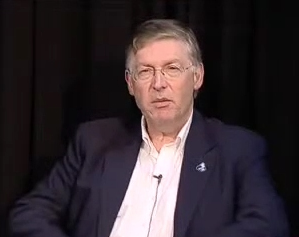
Peter Quinn in 2011

Professor Peter Quinn is Executive Director of the International Centre for Radio Astronomy Research (ICRAR) in Perth, Western Australia and was previously the Head of the Data Management and Operations Division at the European Southern Observatory (ESO) in Munich.

Prof. Quinn has authored more than 300 published scientific papers and was awarded the 'Western Australian Scientist of the Year' in 2012. Prof. Quinn is also a Fellow of Australian Academy of Technological Sciences and Engineering.

At ESO, Prof. Quinn was working towards the creation of the Astrophysical Virtual Observatory, a massive virtual database of astronomical data, designed to allow astrophysicists to carry out research using existing data without using valuable telescope time.

Prior to working at ESO, Prof. Quinn taught astrophysics at the California Institute of Technology (Caltech) for several years, working alongside Gerald Jay Sussman, and has worked at the NASA Space Telescope Science Institute (STScI) in Baltimore. His scientific interests include the study of dark matter, computational cosmology, galactic formation, and MACHOs.
