= Hiram Perkins =

American astronomer and philanthropist

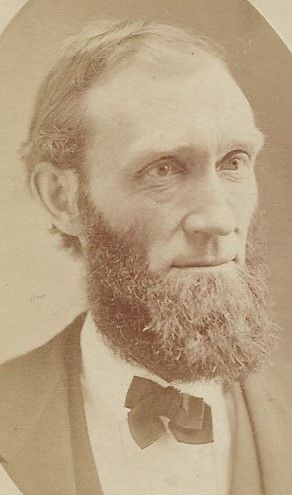
Hiram Perkins

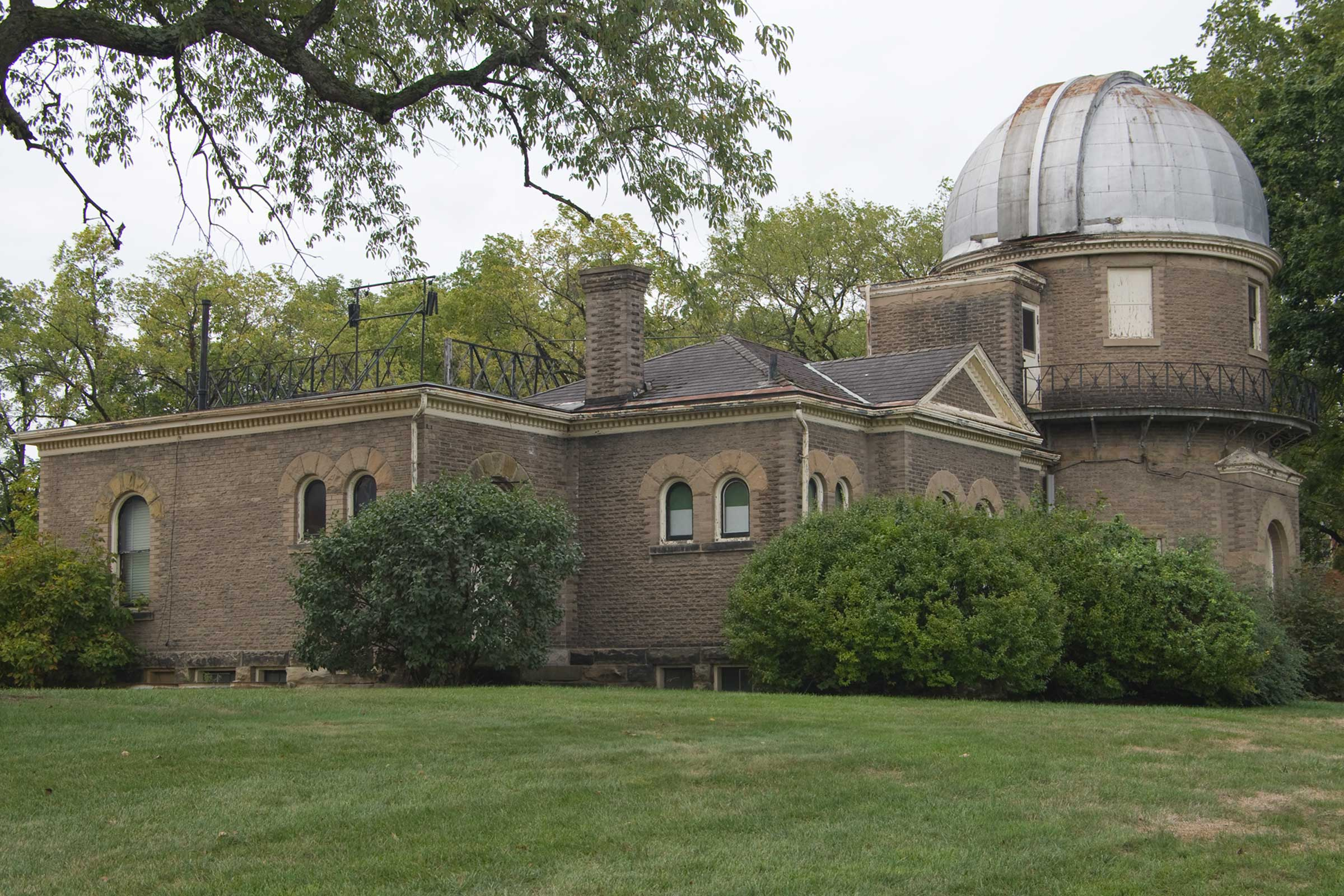
The older (first Perkins) observatory building survived into the 21st century

Hiram Mills Perkins (1833-1924) was Professor of Mathematics and Astronomy at Ohio Wesleyan University and benefactor of the Perkins Telescope in the Perkins Observatory. He helped build to observatory buildings and also left an endowment for the school, and also his house was later used as a dormitory before it was sold off.

Perkins taught at the university from 1873 to 1907.

The Perkins telescope was the 3rd largest telescope in the world when it achieved first light in 1931.

The telescope was eventually moved to Lowell Observatory, and the 69-inch mirror was sent to a museum when it was replaced by a 72 inch one at that observatory.

In 1880 Perkins built a house at 235 W. William St, which was later used as a dorm by OWU.

Perkin's house survived into the 21st century, and was used as a dorm by OWU university. The home (later dorm) was located 235 W. William St. In the 2017 the school sold it off for 170,000 USD, to a developer who planned to convert it into a hotel.

10029 Hiramperkins, a main belt asteroid discovered in 1981 by Edward Bowell at the Anderson Mesa Station of the Lowell Observatory, was named in honor of Hiram Mills Perkins.

== See also ==
- List of largest optical telescopes in the 20th century
