= Wow! signal =

1977 radio signal detected as part of SETI

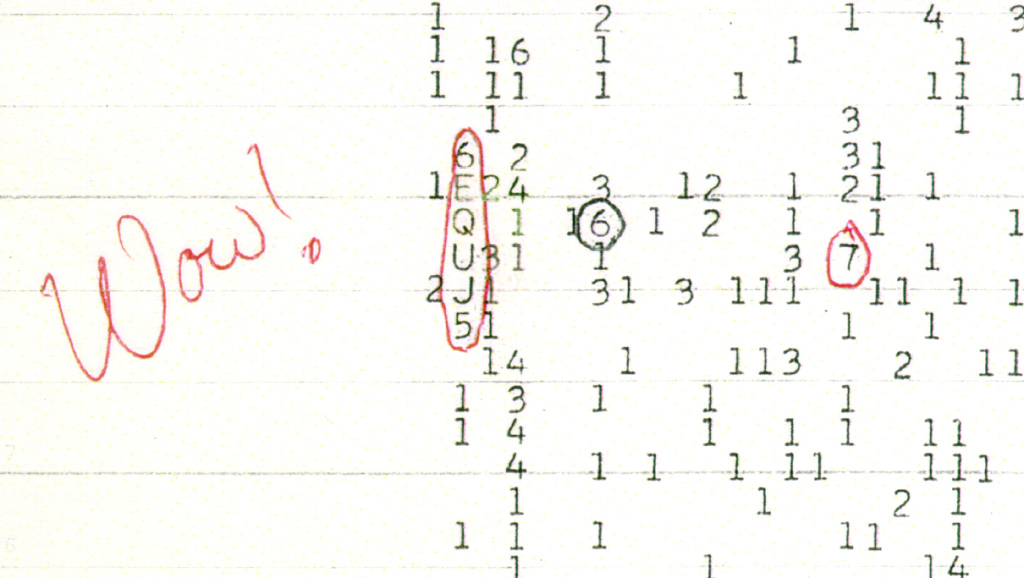
The Wow! signal represented as "6EQUJ5" on the computer printout, with Ehman's handwritten exclamation

The Wow! signal was a strong narrowband radio signal detected on August 15, 1977, by Ohio State University's Big Ear radio telescope in the United States, then used to support the search for extraterrestrial intelligence. The signal appeared to come from the direction of the constellation Sagittarius and bore expected hallmarks of extraterrestrial origin.

Astronomer Jerry R. Ehman discovered the anomaly a few days later while reviewing the recorded data. On the computer printout, he circled the reading of the signal's intensity, "6EQUJ5", and wrote the comment "Wow!" beside it, leading to the event's widely used name.

The entire signal sequence lasted for the full 72-second window during which Big Ear was able to observe it. Despite numerous follow-up searches and hypotheses (including brief consideration of reflections from space debris, interstellar scintillation, and comet hydrogen clouds), the signal has never recurred, and no explanation, terrestrial or otherwise, has been confirmed. While some researchers have suggested it could represent an extraterrestrial transmission, its single occurrence and lack of replication limit the strength of this interpretation. The Wow! signal has inspired targeted searches, scientific discussion about rare astrophysical phenomena, and references in popular culture.

== Background ==
In a 1959 paper, Cornell University physicists Philip Morrison and Giuseppe Cocconi had speculated that any extraterrestrial civilization attempting to communicate via radio signals might do so using a frequency of 1420 megahertz (21-centimeter spectral line), which is naturally emitted by hydrogen, the most common element in the universe and therefore likely familiar to all technologically advanced civilizations.

In 1973, after completing an extensive survey of extragalactic radio sources, Ohio State University assigned the now-defunct Ohio State University Radio Observatory (nicknamed "Big Ear") to the scientific search for extraterrestrial intelligence (SETI), in the longest-running program of this kind in history. The radio telescope was located near the Perkins Observatory on the campus of Ohio Wesleyan University in Delaware, Ohio.

By 1977, Ehman was working at the SETI project as a volunteer; his job involved analyzing by hand large amounts of data processed by an IBM 1130 computer and recorded on line printer paper. While perusing data collected on August 15 at 22:16 EST (23:16 EDT local time, 03:16 UTC), he spotted a series of values of signal intensity and frequency that left him and his colleagues astonished. The event was later documented in technical detail by the observatory's director.

== Signal measurement ==
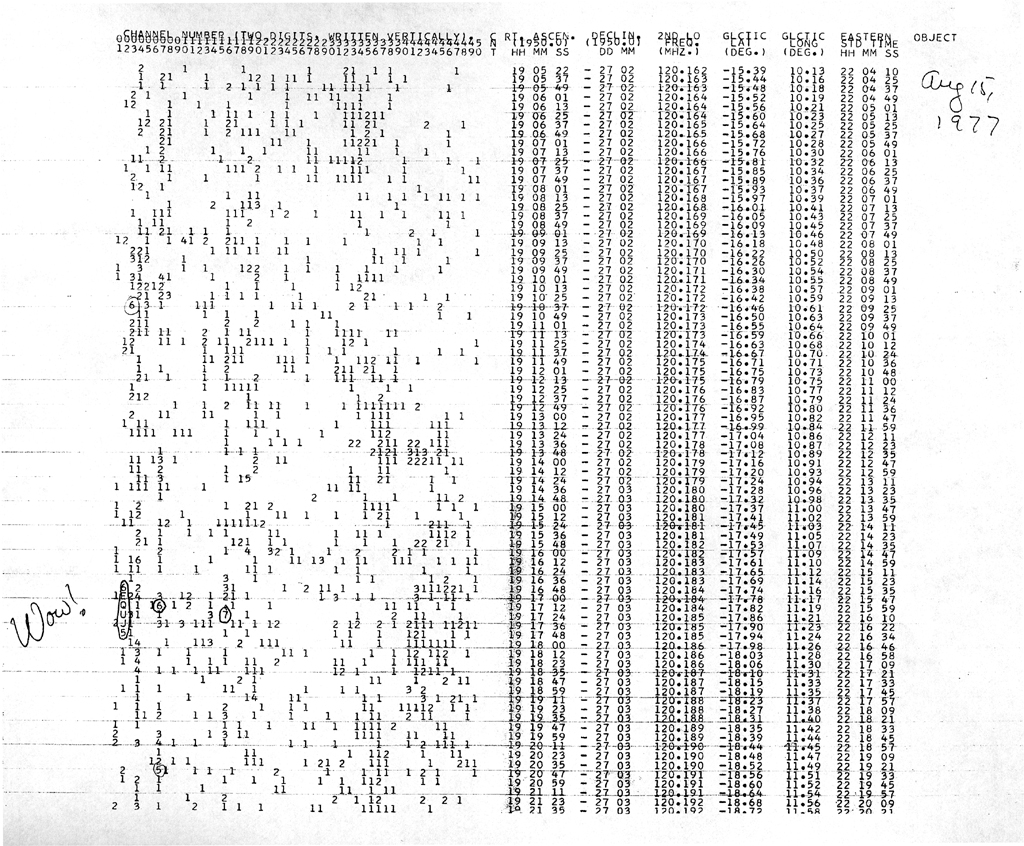
The section of the computer printout containing the Wow! signal (bottom left), hand-dated "Aug 15, 1977". The original document is preserved by Ohio History Connection.

Plot of signal intensity versus time

The string 6EQUJ5, commonly misinterpreted as a message encoded in the radio signal, represents in fact the signal's intensity variation over time, expressed in the particular measuring system adopted for the experiment. The signal itself appeared to be an unmodulated continuous wave, although any modulation with a period of less than 10 seconds or longer than 72 seconds would not have been detectable.

=== Intensity ===
The signal intensity was measured as signal-to-noise ratio, with the noise (or baseline) averaged over the previous few minutes. The signal was sampled for 10 seconds and then processed by the computer, which took 2 seconds. The result for each frequency channel was printed as a single alphanumeric character, representing the 10-second average intensity minus the baseline, expressed as a dimensionless multiple of the signal's standard deviation.

In this particular intensity scale, a space character denotes an intensity between 0 and 1; that is, between baseline and one standard deviation above it. The numbers 1 to 9 denoted the correspondingly numbered intensities (from 1 to 9); intensities of 10 and above were indicated by a letter: "A" corresponded to intensities between 10 and 11, "B" to 11 to 12, and so on. The Wow! signal's highest measured value was "U" (an intensity between 30 and 31), which is thirty standard deviations above background noise.

=== Frequency ===
John Kraus, the director of the observatory, gave a value of 1420.3556 MHz in a 1994 summary written for Carl Sagan. However, Ehman in 1998 gave a value of 1420.4556±0.005 MHz. This is (50±5 kHz) above the hydrogen line value (with no red- or blue-shift) of 1420.4058 MHz. If due to blue-shift, it would correspond to the source moving about 10 km/s (6.2 mi/s) towards Earth.

A heat map of the computer printout, giving a spectrogram of the beam; the Wow! signal appears as a bright spot in the lower left.

An explanation of the difference between Ehman's value and Kraus's can be found in Ehman's paper. The first local oscillator in the telescope's radio receiver was specified to a frequency value of 1450.4056 MHz. However, the university's purchasing department made a typographical error in the order form, instead obtaining an oscillator with frequency 1450.5056 MHz (i.e., 0.1 MHz higher than desired). The software used in the experiment was then written to adjust for this error. When Ehman computed the frequency of the Wow! signal, he took this error into account.

=== Bandwidth ===
The Wow! signal had a bandwidth of less than 10 kHz. It is considered narrowband emission in the sense that its fractional bandwidth was relatively small (~0.001%). However, the 10 kHz bandwidth is not small compared to the bandwidth of some astrophysical masers (~1 kHz) or to the frequency resolution of modern narrowband SETI searches (~1 Hz). The Big Ear telescope was equipped with a receiver capable of measuring fifty 10 kHz-wide channels. The output from each channel was represented in the computer printout as a column of alphanumeric intensity values. The Wow! signal is essentially confined to one column.

=== Time variation ===
At the time of the observation, the Big Ear radio telescope was only adjustable for altitude (or height above the horizon), and relied on the rotation of the Earth to scan across the sky. Given the speed of Earth's rotation and the spatial width of the telescope's observation window, the Big Ear could observe any given point for just 72 seconds. A continuous extraterrestrial signal, therefore, would be expected to register for exactly 72 seconds, and the recorded intensity of such a signal would display a gradual increase for the first 36 seconds—peaking at the center of the observation window—and then a gradual decrease as the telescope moved away from it. All these characteristics are present in the Wow! signal.

== Celestial location ==
The two regions of space in the constellation Sagittarius from where the Wow! signal may have originated. The ambiguity is due to how the telescope was designed. For clarity, the widths (right ascension) of the red bands have been exaggerated.

The precise location in the sky where the signal apparently originated is uncertain due to the design of the Big Ear telescope, which featured two feed horns, each receiving a beam from slightly different directions, while following Earth's rotation. The Wow! signal was detected in one beam but not in the other, and the data were processed in such a way that it is impossible to determine which of the two horns received the signal. There are, therefore, two possible right ascension (RA) values for the location of the signal (expressed below in terms of the two main reference systems):

| | B1950 equinox | J2000 equinox |
| RA (positive horn) | 19^{h}22^{m}24.64^{s} ± 5^{s} | 19^{h}25^{m}31^{s} ± 10^{s} |
| RA (negative horn) | 19^{h}25^{m}17.01^{s} ± 5^{s} | 19^{h}28^{m}22^{s} ± 10^{s} |

In contrast, the declination was unambiguously determined to be as follows:

| | B1950 equinox | J2000 equinox |
| Declination | −27°03′ ± 20′ | −26°57′ ± 20′ |

The galactic coordinates for the positive horn are l=11.7°, b=−18.9°, and for the negative horn l=11.9°, b=−19.5°, both being therefore about 19° toward the southeast of the galactic plane, and about 24° or 25° east of the Galactic Center. The region of the sky in question lies northwest of the globular cluster M55, in the constellation Sagittarius, roughly 2.5 degrees south of the fifth-magnitude star group Chi Sagittarii, and about 3.5 degrees south of the plane of the ecliptic. The closest easily visible star is Tau Sagittarii.

Initially, no nearby Sun-like stars were known to lie within the antenna coordinates, although in any direction, the antenna pattern would encompass about six distant Sun-like stars as estimated in 2016. In 2022, a paper published in the International Journal of Astrobiology identified three likely Sun-like stars within the antenna-pointed coordinates. The better characterized star, 2MASS 19281982-2640123, is located 1,800 light-years away, only 132 light-years away from Maccone's estimation, where an intelligent civilization is more likely to exist. The other two candidates, 2MASS 19252173-2713537 and 2MASS 19282229-2702492, were insufficiently characterized but still likely to be Sun-like stars. Also, 14 other catalogued stars at the antenna coordinates may still turn out to be similar to the Sun after more data becomes available. As a response to the discovery, Breakthrough Listen conducted the first targeted search for the Wow! Signal in its first collaboration between the Green Bank Telescope and the Allen Telescope Array of the SETI Institute. The observations were performed on May 21, 2022, lasting 1 hour from Greenbank, 35 minutes from ATA, and 9 minutes and 40 seconds simultaneously. No technosignature candidates were found.

== Hypotheses on the signal's origin ==
Interstellar scintillation of a weaker continuous signal—similar in effect to atmospheric twinkling—could be an explanation, but that would not exclude the possibility of the signal being artificial in origin. The significantly more sensitive Very Large Array did not detect the signal, and the probability that a signal below the detection threshold of the Very Large Array could be detected by the Big Ear due to interstellar scintillation is low. Other hypotheses include a rotating lighthouse-like source, a signal sweeping in frequency, or a one-time burst.

Ehman said in 1994: "We should have seen it again when we looked for it 50 times. Something suggests it was an Earth-sourced signal that simply got reflected off a piece of space debris." He later somewhat recanted his skepticism, after further research showed the unrealistic requirements that a space-borne reflector would need to have to produce the observed signal. The signal's frequency of 1420 MHz is also part of a protected spectrum: a frequency range reserved for astronomical research in which terrestrial transmissions are forbidden, although a 2010 study documented several instances of terrestrial sources either interfering from adjacent frequency bands or illegally transmitting within the spectrum. In a 1997 paper, Ehman resists "drawing vast conclusions from half-vast data"—acknowledging the possibility that the source may have been military or otherwise a product of Earth-bound sources. In a 2019 interview with John Michael Godier, Ehman stated: "I'm convinced that the Wow! signal certainly has the potential of being the first signal from extraterrestrial intelligence."

METI president Douglas Vakoch told Die Welt that any putative SETI signal detections must be replicated for confirmation, and the lack of such replication for the Wow! signal means it has little credibility.

In August 2024, the Planetary Habitability Laboratory published a preprint reporting observations made in 2020 at the Arecibo Observatory in Puerto Rico, where they conclude that the Wow! signal was likely caused by a rare astrophysical event, in which stellar emissions energizing a cold hydrogen cloud caused it to suddenly surge in brightness.

=== Discredited hypotheses ===
In 2017, Antonio Paris, Assistant Professor of Astronomy and Astrophysics at St. Petersburg College, Florida, proposed that the hydrogen cloud surrounding two comets, 266P/Christensen and 335P/Gibbs, now known to have been in the same region of the sky, could have been the source of the Wow! signal. This hypothesis was dismissed by astronomers, including members of the original Big Ear research team, as the cited comets were not in the beam at the correct time. Furthermore, comets do not emit strongly at the frequencies involved.

== Searches for recurrence of the signal ==
Several attempts were made by Ehman and other astronomers to recover and identify the signal. The signal was expected to occur three minutes apart in each of the telescope's feed horns, but that did not happen. Ehman unsuccessfully searched for recurrences using Big Ear in the months after the detection.

In 1987 and 1989, Robert H. Gray searched for the event using the META array at Oak Ridge Observatory, but did not detect it. In a July 1995 test of signal detection software to be used in its upcoming Project Argus, SETI League executive director H. Paul Shuch made several drift-scan observations of the Wow! signal's coordinates with a 12-meter radio telescope at the National Radio Astronomy Observatory in Green Bank, West Virginia, also achieving a null result.

In 1995 and 1996, Gray again searched for the signal using the Very Large Array, which is significantly more sensitive than Big Ear. Gray and Simon Ellingsen later searched for recurrences of the event in 1999 using the 26-meter radio telescope at the University of Tasmania's Mount Pleasant Radio Observatory. Six 14-hour observations were made at positions in the vicinity, but nothing like the Wow! signal was detected.

== Response ==
In 2012, on the 35th anniversary of the Wow! signal, the Arecibo Observatory was said to have beamed a digital stream towards Hipparcos 34511, 33277, and 43587. The transmission consisted of approximately 10,000 Twitter messages solicited for the purpose by the National Geographic Channel, bearing the hashtag "#ChasingUFOs" (a promotion for one of the channel's TV series). The sponsor also included a series of video vignettes featuring verbal messages from various celebrities. According to Robert Kerr, the former director of the Arecibo Observatory who oversaw the Wow! reply, the transmitter overheated shortly into the first transmission, and it was only sent in the direction of one of the targets. It is unknown how many tweets made it through. None of the targeted stars is within the possible region from which the Wow! signal came.

To increase the probability that any extraterrestrial recipients would recognize the signal as an intentional communication from another intelligent life form, Arecibo scientists attached a repeating-sequence header to each message.

== In popular culture ==
The signal was featured in the 2024 television series 3 Body Problem, in which the signal is also detected in Inner Mongolia. The signal was also referenced in the 1994 season 2 premiere of The X-Files, "Little Green Men".

The English rock band Muse named their tenth studio album, released in June 2026, after the Wow! signal.

== See also ==
- Arecibo message – Radio message sent into space in 1974
- BLC1 – Narrowband radio signal detected in April and May 2019
- Bloop – Underwater sound detected in 1997 from a non-tectonic cryoseism (ice quake)
- Fast radio burst – Astronomical high energy transient pulse
- List of interstellar radio messages
- Oh-My-God particle – Ultra-high-energy cosmic ray detected in 1991
- Quiet and loud aliens – Concept in astrobiology
- Radio signal from HD 164595 – Star in the constellation of Hercules
- SHGb02+14a – Astronomical radio source discovered by the SETI@home project (March 2003)
