= 2MASS 19281982−2640123 =

Star in the constellation of Sagittarius

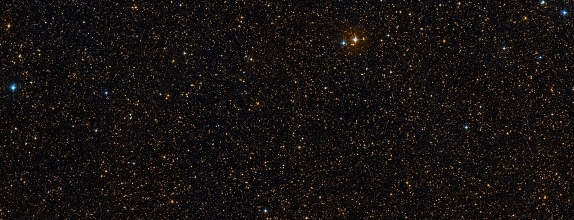
- Approximate location of the Wow! Signal in the constellation of Sagittarius

Observation data Epoch J2000.0 Equinox ICRS
- Constellation: Sagittarius
- Right ascension: 19^{h} 28^{m} 19.821^{s}
- Declination: −26° 40′ 12.33″

Characteristics
- Apparent magnitude (G): 13.38

Astrometry
Radial velocity (R_{v})	−13.71±6.02 km/s
Proper motion (μ)	RA: −5.522±0.022 mas/yr Dec.: −16.529±0.017 mas/yr
Parallax (π)	1.8244±0.0194 mas
Distance	1,790 ± 20 ly (548 ± 6 pc)

Details
Radius	0.997 R_{☉}
Luminosity	1.0007 L_{☉}
Temperature	5783 K

Other designations
- Gaia DR2 6766185791864654720, Gaia DR3 6766185791864654720

Database references

2MASS 19281982−2640123 is a Sun-like star located in the constellation Sagittarius where the Wow! Signal is most widely believed to have originated. The star was identified in a 2022 paper as the most similar to the Sun out of the three solar analogs found inside the sky region. The star is 1,800 light years away; this is approximately 132 light years away from Claudio Maccone's estimation of where the closest communicative civilization to Earth is most likely to exist per his calculated solution to the Drake Equation.

The star has a right ascension of 19^{h} 28^{m} 19.821^{s}, a declination of −26° 40′ 12.33″, an estimated temperature of 5,783 Kelvin, a radius of 0.99 solar radii, and a luminosity 1.0007 times that of the Sun. The team used the Gaia Archive to identify another dozen of candidates to be Sun-like stars, but the estimations on their luminosity were unknown.

== Breakthrough listen search ==
As a response to the discovery, on May 21, 2022 Breakthrough Listen conducted the first targeted search for the Wow! Signal to find its source. It also was its first collaboration between the Green Bank Telescope and the Allen Telescope Array (ATA) of the SETI Institute.

Greenbank performed two 30-minute observations, the ATA did six 5-minute observations with its new beam-former backend, and both observatories observed a total of 9 minutes and 40 seconds at the same time. The team used the turboSETI pipeline from 1–2 GHz to search for an artificial narrowband signal (2.79 Hz/1.91 Hz) with a drifting of ±4 Hz s−1. No technosignature candidates were reportedly found.
