= International Centre for Radio Astronomy Research =

Astronomy research institute in Perth, Western Australia

International Centre for Radio Astronomy Research (ICRAR)
- Established: August 2009
- Location: ICRAR (UWA); 2nd Floor; Ken and Julie Michael Building; University of Western Australia; 7 Fairway; Crawley, Perth; Western Australia 6009; Australia ICRAR (Curtin); Brodie-Hall Building; Technology Park; 1 Turner Avenue; Bentley, Perth; Western Australia 6102; Australia International Centre for Radio Astronomy Research (Perth)
- Type: Research facility
- Executive director: Simon Ellingsen
- Chairperson: David James Skellern
- Employees: 150
- Website: ICRAR.org

The International Centre for Radio Astronomy Research (ICRAR) is a multi-institutional astronomy research centre based in Perth, Western Australia. The centre is a joint venture between Curtin University and the University of Western Australia, with 'nodes' located at both universities. As of 2024, ICRAR has approximately 150 staff and students across both nodes.

== History ==
ICRAR launched in August 2009 with funding support from the State Government of Western Australia. Initially funded for five years to support Australia's bid to host the SKA telescopes, its funding was extended for an additional five year periods in 2013 (ICRAR II), 2019 (ICRAR III) and 2024 (ICRAR IV).

In 2013, ICRAR became the first user of the Pawsey Supercomputing Centre, based in Kensington.

== Research ==
Although radio astronomy features in the centre's name, its research has expanded to include optical and multi-wavelength astronomy.

Each of the centre's two university nodes specialises in different areas of astronomical research. The Curtin node specialises in extragalactic radio science, accretion physics and slow transients, the epoch of reionisation, and pulsars & other fast transients. The UWA node specialises in studying galaxies in the local and distant Universe, and cosmological theory, with a particular focus on galactic and cosmological simulations. The UWA node also operates a data intensive astronomy program, which researches techniques for managing and processing the large amounts of data created by current and future radio telescopes.

Both nodes also operate engineering research programs, largely dedicated to the design and operation of radio telescopes and development of related spin-off technologies. In particular, the timing and synchronisation system for the SKA-Mid radio telescope and the power and signal distribution system for the SKA-Low radio telescope were designed at developed at ICRAR's UWA and Curtin nodes, respectively.

ICRAR has also contributed to the design, technical operations and science programs of several Australian SKA precursors and prototypes, including the Murchison Widefield Array (MWA), the Australian Square Kilometre Array Pathfinder (ASKAP), and the Aperture Array Verification Systems (AAVS1,2&3), located at Inyarrimanha Ilgari Bundara, the CSIRO Murchison Radio-astronomy Observatory.

== Management ==
ICRAR is governed by a board, with representatives from the government, both universities, and other stakeholders including the CSIRO. The inaugural board chair was Bernard Bowen, (February 2009 - July 2016). The current chair is David Skellern, appointed March 2024.

ICRAR's day-to-day operations are managed by an executive team with members across both university nodes. The founding executive director was Peter Quinn (2009-2022). The current executive director is Simon Ellingsen.

== Citizen Science ==
ICRAR has run several successful citizen science projects.

theSkyNet employed Internet-connected computers owned by the general public to do research in astronomy using BOINC technology. It combined the spectral coverage of the GALEX, Pan-STARRS1, and WISE to generate a multi-wavelength (ultra-violet - optical - near infra-red) galaxy atlas for the nearby Universe. In September 2014 theSkyNet had 13573 total users, and 5198 recent users. theSkyNet was powered down in 2018.

AstroQuest launched in 2019, and aimed to help Australian scientists understand how galaxies grow and evolve. Users inspected images of galaxies, and used paint tools to help classify light as coming from the galaxy or from other sources. As of 2021, approximately 10,000 users had classified the complete dataset of 60,000 galaxies, and the project is on indefinite hold awaiting more galaxies to classify.

== Notable discoveries ==
In 2022, an unusual slow periodic radio transient was discovered in archival data in GLEAM (GaLactic and Extragalactic All-sky Murchison Widefield Array Survey), catalogued as GLEAM-XJ162759.5-523504, the astrophysical radio source had an 18 minute period with 1 minute long bursts, not matching any then known periodic variables.

== See also ==
- List of astronomical societies
