= NGC 548 =

Galaxy in the constellation Cetus

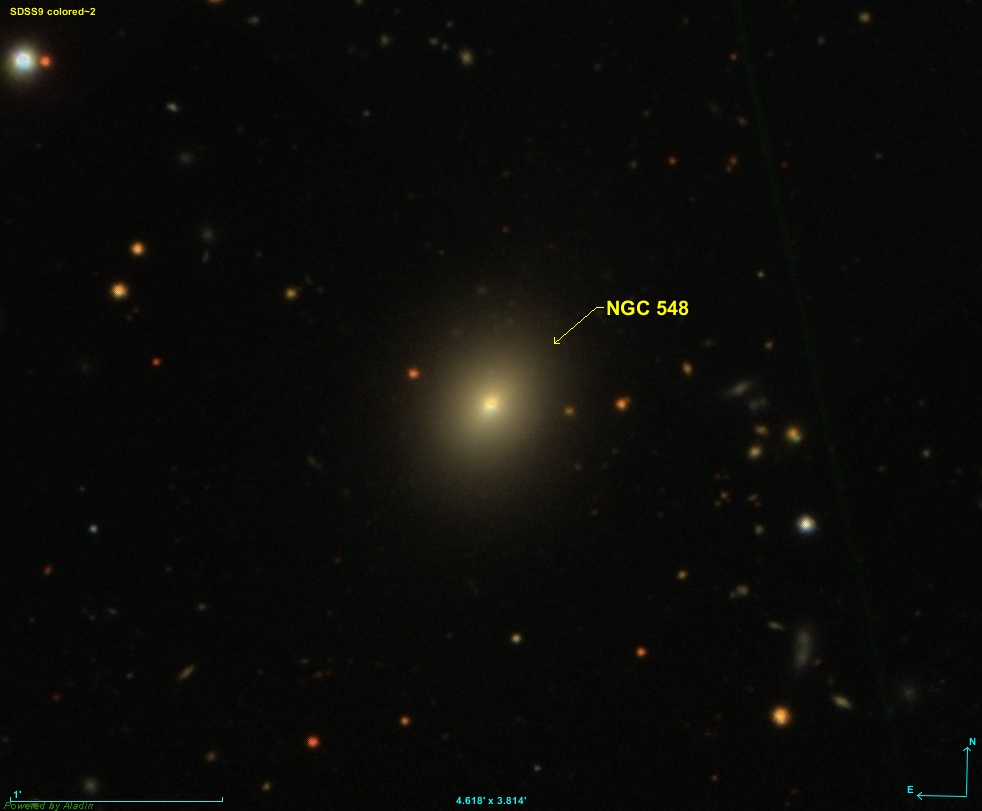
- SDSS view of NGC 548

Observation data (J2000 epoch)
- Constellation: Cetus
- Right ascension: 01^{h} 26^{m} 02.5^{s}
- Declination: −01° 13′ 32″
- Redshift: 0.01802 ± 0.00001
- Heliocentric radial velocity: (5354 ± 3) km/s
- Distance: 244 Mly
- Apparent magnitude (V): 13.7
- Apparent magnitude (B): 14.7

Characteristics
- Type: E
- Apparent size (V): 0.8' × 0.5'

Other designations
- 2MASS J01260251-0113324, UGC 1010, MCG +00-04-141, PGC 5326

NGC 548, also occasionally referred to as PGC 5326 or UGC 1010, is an elliptical galaxy in the constellation Cetus. It is located approximately 244 million light-years from the Solar System and was discovered on 2 November 1867 by American astronomer George Mary Searle.

== Observation history ==
Searle discovered NGC 548 at Harvard Observatory using a 15" Merz refractor telescope. His given micrometric position also matches UGC 1010 and PGC 5326.

== See also ==
- Elliptical galaxy
- List of NGC objects (1–1000)
- Cetus
