= 266P/Christensen =

Encke-type comet

Discovery
- Discovered by: Eric J. Christensen
- Discovery site: Catalina Sky Survey
- Discovery date: 27 October 2006

Designations
- MPC designation: P/2006 U5; P/2012 P1
- Alternative designations: Christensen 12

Orbital characteristics
- Epoch: 26 December 2026 (JD 2461400.5)
- Observation arc: 19.95 years (Note: Observation arc from the Minor Planet Center database covering dates from 27 October 2006 until 8 October 2026.)
- Number of observations: 913
- Aphelion: 4.733 AU
- Perihelion: 2.324 AU
- Semi-major axis: 3.529 AU
- Eccentricity: 0.34133
- Orbital period: 6.628 years
- Inclination: 3.429°
- Longitude of ascending node: 4.941°
- Argument of periapsis: 97.951°
- Mean anomaly: 2.763°
- Last perihelion: 19 April 2020
- Next perihelion: 7 December 2026
- T_{Jupiter}: 3.020
- Earth MOID: 1.351 AU
- Jupiter MOID: 0.526 AU

Physical characteristics
- Mean radius: 1.66 km (1.03 mi)
- Comet total magnitude (M1): 11.0
- Comet nuclear magnitude (M2): 15.9

266P/Christensen is a Encke-type comet with a 6.63-year orbit around the Sun. It will next come to perihelion in December 2026. It had been suggested as the possible source of the 1977 "Wow! Signal", however this was later disproven by a follow-up study in 2020, where it was found out to be likely a maser-like flare from small hydrogen clouds in interstellar space instead. It reaches perihelion on 7 December 2026 and gets slightly brighter when it passes 1.4 AU from Earth on 13 January 2027.

== Physical characteristics ==
Observations conducted by the Sloan Digital Sky Survey (SDSS) in 2012 revealed that the nucleus of 266P has an upper limit no greater than 1.66 km (1.03 mi) in radius.

== Notes ==
Numbered comets
Previous; 265P/LINEAR	266P/Christensen	Next; 267P/LONEOS
