= Ohio Sky Survey =

Astronomical survey (1965-1971)

- Website: www.bigear.org/ohiosurv.htm

The Ohio Sky Survey was an astronomical survey of extragalactic radio sources. Data were taken between 1965 and 1971 using the Big Ear radio telescope at the Ohio State University Radio Observatory (OSURO), also known as the "Big Ear Radio Observatory (BERO)".

The survey covered 94% of the sky area between the limiting declinations of 63°N and 36°S with a resolution at 1415 MHz of 40 arc minutes in declination. The survey was carried out primarily at a frequency of 1415 MHz but observations were also made at 2650 MHz and 612 MHz. Roughly 19,620 sources were identified over the course of the survey of which 60% were previously uncatalogued.

The survey was unique in that it covered a larger portion of the sky, to a greater depth, and at a higher frequency, than any previous survey. In addition, all previously catalogued sources were tabulated and maps of the areas surveyed were included with the positions of all catalogued sources.

Sources discovered in the course of the survey were assigned names according to a coordinate numbering system consisting of a two-letter prefix followed by three digits. The first letter, O, stood for Ohio, and the second letter, B–Z inclusive (omitting O) indicated the source right ascension in hours (0–23 inclusive). The first digit indicated the declination zone in increments of 10°, while the last two digits give the source number within the specified region of right ascension and declination.

Data reduction for the survey was done using a computer program developed by John D. Kraus and Robert S. Dixon.

The Ohio Sky Survey was published in seven installments and two supplements.
