= Laura P. Bautz =

American astronomer

Laura Patricia (Pat) Bautz (1940–2014) was an American astronomer who worked for many years at the National Science Foundation, where she directed the Division of Astronomical Science. The Bautz–Morgan classification of galaxy clusters is named for her work with William Wilson Morgan, published in 1970.

== Early life and education ==
Bautz was originally from Baltimore, and astronomer John D. Strong of Johns Hopkins University and later the California Institute of Technology was the father of one of her friends. After starting her education at a college that discouraged her from taking any mathematics, Bautz transferred to Vanderbilt University. She majored in physics there, graduating in 1961, and beginning her study of astronomy with a course taken in the final year of her undergraduate program.

She completed her Ph.D. at the University of Wisconsin in 1966, studying astronomy there as part of a group of female doctoral students who began working at the university in the early 1960s. Her dissertation, Models for Carbon-Oxygen Stars of One Solar Mass in the Late Stages of Evolution, involved the simulation of white dwarf stars, originally under the supervision of Donald Edward Osterbrock and later with John S. Mathis.

== Career and later life ==
She became an astronomy instructor at Northwestern University in 1965, before completing her doctorate, and was promoted to associate professor in 1967. At Northwestern, she worked in the Dearborn Observatory, began taking an interest in galaxy clusters, and published an influential 1970 paper with William Wilson Morgan on the classification of these clusters according to the relative brightness of the brightest galaxy in a cluster with its other members. The Bautz–Morgan classification of galaxy clusters comes from this work.

Bautz remained at Northwestern until 1974, with a leave in 1972 to work in the National Science Foundation. In 1974 she moved to the National Science Foundation permanently. Initially working there in the physics division, she was director of the Division of Astronomical Science by the early 1980s, and later held other roles in Education and Human Resources and in the foundation's International Division.

== Recognition ==
Bautz was named a Fellow of the American Association for the Advancement of Science in 1991.
