= William Wilson Morgan =

American astronomer

- Born: January 3, 1906
- Died: June 21, 1994 (aged 88)
- Education: University of Chicago (B.Sc.), (M.Sc.), (PhD)
- Known for: Bautz-Morgan classification, cD galaxy type, MK system
- Awards: Bruce Medal (1958); Henry Draper Medal (1980)
- Scientific career
- Fields: astronomy, astrophysics
- Workplaces: Yerkes Observatory
- Doctoral advisor: Otto Struve
- Doctoral students: Arne Slettebak, Nancy Grace Roman

William Wilson Morgan (January 3, 1906 – June 21, 1994) was an American astronomer and astrophysicist. The principal theme in Morgan's work was stellar and galaxy classification. He is also known for helping prove the existence of spiral arms in our galaxy. In addition to his scientific achievements, he served as professor and astronomy director for the University of Chicago's Yerkes Observatory in Wisconsin and was the managing editor for George Hale's Astrophysical Journal.

== Scientific achievements ==
Along with Philip Keenan, he developed the MK system for the classification of stars through their spectra. He also developed several galaxy morphological classification systems, including the first systems to use the physical, quantifiable properties of galaxies, as opposed to simple, qualitative, eyeball estimates favoured by Edwin Hubble. He invented the now widely used classification cD for massive galaxies in the centres of galaxy clusters. In 1970, along with astronomer Laura P. Bautz, they created the still-used Bautz-Morgan classification scheme for clusters, which identifies those containing cD galaxies as the richest, type I clusters.

He worked at Yerkes Observatory for much of his career, including acting as its director from 1960 to 1963. Along with Donald Osterbrock and Stewart Sharpless, he used distance measurements of O and B type stars to show the existence of spiral arms in the Milky Way Galaxy.

From 1947 to 1952, Morgan was managing editor of the Astrophysical Journal, a publication originally started by George Hale to promote scientific cooperation between the world's astrophysicists.

== Education ==
Morgan attended Washington and Lee University but left just before the start of his senior year. He began working as a research assistant at Yerkes Observatory and started taking classes there (Yerkes is affiliated with the University of Chicago). Morgan graduated from the University of Chicago in 1927 with a Bachelor of Science degree on the basis of transfer credits from Washington and Lee combined with his subsequent courses at Yerkes Observatory. While at UC/Yerkes, Morgan continued his post-graduate studies and received a doctorate in December 1931 under Otto Struve.

== Professorship ==
Morgan continued on at the University of Chicago and became an assistant professor in 1936, full professor in 1947, and was promoted to distinguished service professor in 1966.

One of his early graduate students in stellar classification was Nancy Grace Roman, who went on to become NASA's first Chief of Astronomy. Morgan was the chairman of the UC Department of Astronomy from 1960 to 1966.

== Honors ==
Awards and honors

- Bruce Medal (1958)
- Henry Norris Russell Lectureship (1961)
- Fellow of the American Academy of Arts and Sciences (1964)
- Henry Draper Medal of the National Academy of Sciences (1980)
- Herschel Medal (1983)
- Golden Plate Award of the American Academy of Achievement (1985)

Named after him

- Asteroid 3180 Morgan

== See also ==
- Bautz-Morgan classification
- Edwin Hubble
- Gérard de Vaucouleurs
- Galaxy morphological classification
- MK system
