= Ohio State University Radio Observatory =

Kraus-type radio telescope in Ohio from 1963–98

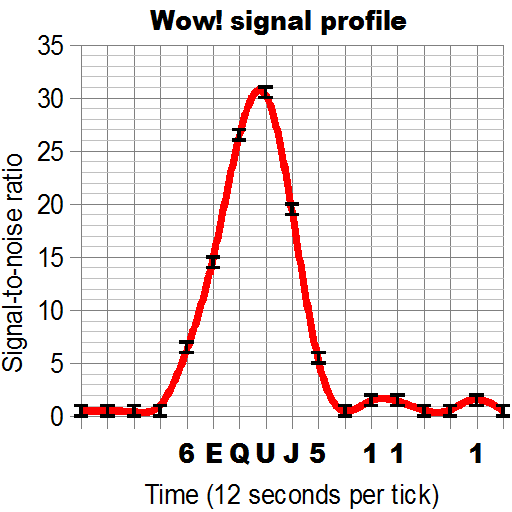
- Alternative names: The Big Ear
- Location: Delaware, Delaware County, Ohio
- Coordinates: 40°15′04″N 83°02′57″W
- Location within the United States

The Ohio State University Radio Observatory was a Kraus-type radio telescope located on the grounds of the Perkins Observatory at Ohio Wesleyan University in Delaware, Ohio from 1963 to 1998. Known as Big Ear, the observatory was part of Ohio State University's Search for Extraterrestrial Intelligence (SETI) project. The telescope was designed by John D. Kraus. Construction of the Big Ear began in 1956 and was completed in 1961, and it was finally turned on for the first time in 1963.

The main reflector of Big Ear—The Flat Reflector—measured approximately 103 meters by 33 meters, giving it the sensitivity equivalent to a circular dish measuring nearly 53 meters in diameter.

The observatory completed the Ohio Sky Survey in 1971, and from 1973–1995, Big Ear was used to search for extraterrestrial radio signals, making it the longest running SETI project in history. In 1977, the Big Ear received the Wow! signal. The observatory was disassembled in 1998 when developers purchased the site from the university and used the land to expand a nearby golf course.

== History ==
From 1965–1971, the Big Ear was used to map wideband radio sources for the Ohio Sky Survey, its first sky survey for extraterrestrial radio sources.

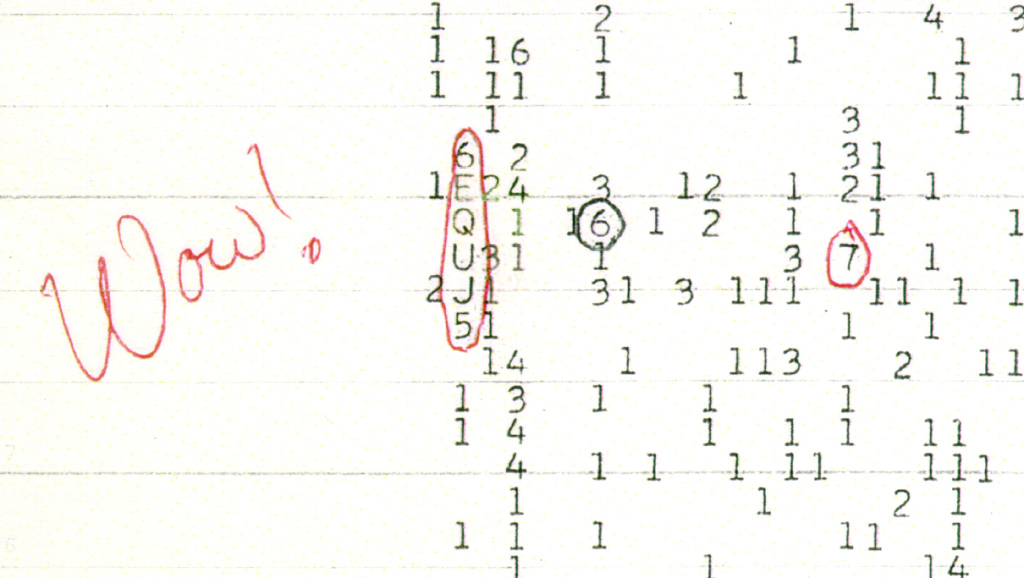
The Wow! signal represented as "6EQUJ5" on the original computer printout

In 1977, the Big Ear recorded an unusual and possible extraterrestrial radio signal, which became known as the Wow! signal. The observation would prove to be unique, since no similar signals were ever detected afterwards. Later research indicated the phenomenon was possibly caused by a transient brightening of hydrogen.

The Big Ear was listed in the 1995 Guinness Book of World Records under the category of "Longest Extraterrestrial Search":

The longest-running full-scale SETI (search for extraterrestrial intelligence) project is the Ohio SETI Program at Ohio State University in Columbus, OH, which has searched the universe for extraterrestrial radio signals for 22 years, beginning in 1973.

== Surveys ==
- Andromeda Galaxy (1963)
- Ohio Sky Survey (1965–1971)
- SETI (1973–1995)

== See also ==
- List of astronomical observatories
- Radio astronomy
