= McMillin Observatory =

Observatory at Ohio State University

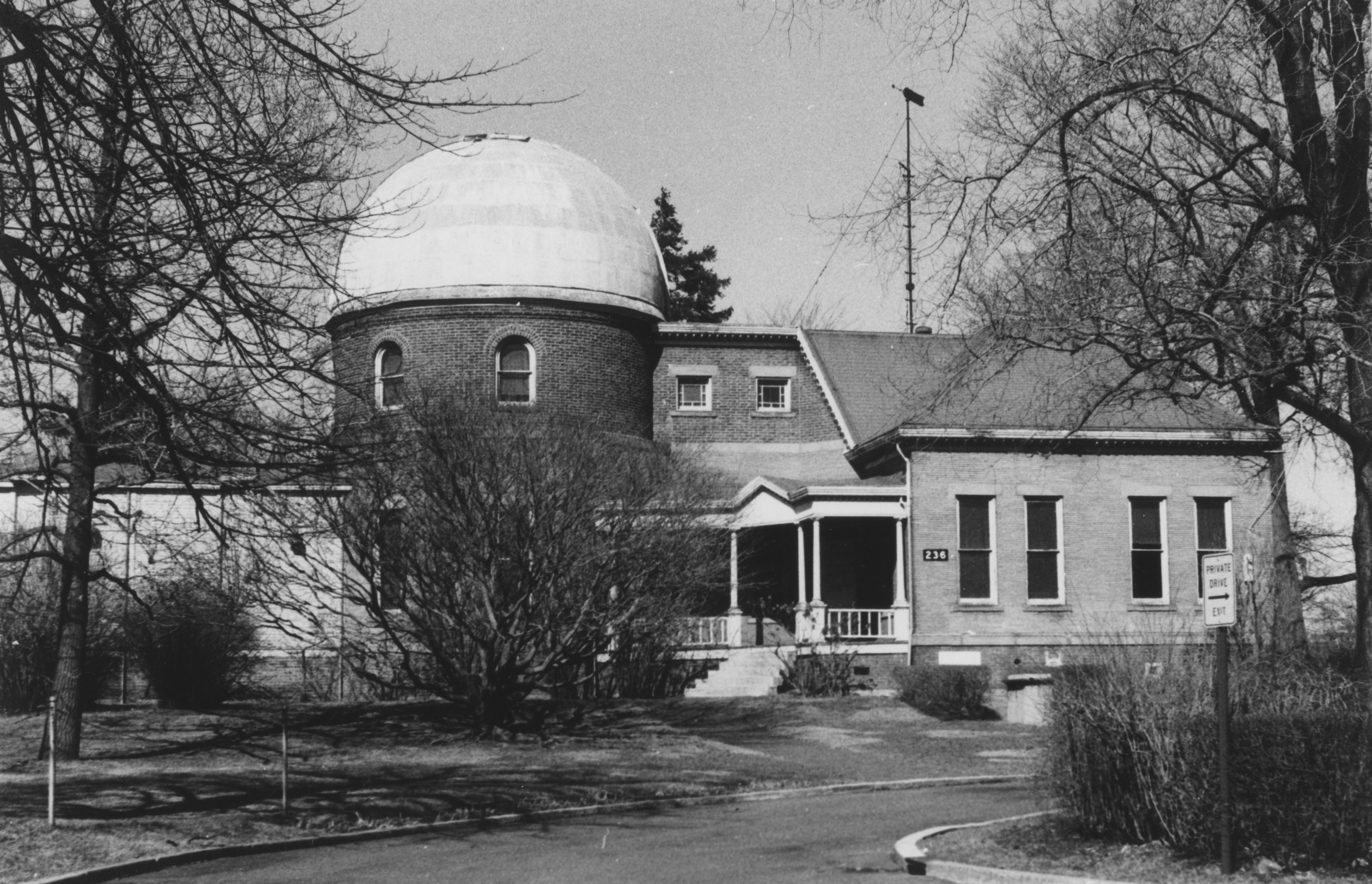
McMillin Observatory spring of 1971

McMillin Observatory was an astronomical observatory built around 1895 on the campus of Ohio State University. Named after Emerson McMillin and operated by the university, the observatory closed in 1968 and its telescope later moved to Ballreich Observatory. The observatory was equipped with photographic cameras, a filar micrometer, and a custom Brashear spectroscope. The observatory had two main focuses, education and at least one astronomic scientific research study focus.

== History ==
The director of the observatory was Professor Henry C. Lord.

The observatory was equipped with a 12.5 inch aperture refractor, the largest telescope in Ohio, USA on its debut in 1896. It was on a Warner and Swasey mounting and Brashear made the optics. An 1896 document about the observatory said the Warner and Swasey mount was so well known it did no need description.

The observatory was formally opened on June 16, 1896. The building included the one foot refractor, a laboratory, and a planetarium. The refractor was equipped with a spectrograph. Also, although the observatory was not opened until June, the telescope was ready by December 1895.

In the 1930s OSU became involved with the Perkins Observatory, which had been given a 69-inch reflector. This was the third largest telescope in the world, and OSU and that observatory had an agreement for about 70 years.

The refractor was reportedly given to Kaubisch Memorial Library of Fostoria in 1975, however it was not moved out due to its size and was put in storage when the University had the building razed in 1976.

In the 1980s the refactor was established in the Ballreich observatory. Then the telescope was eventually owned by Heidelberg University of Ohio, while it remains at Ballreich. It was reported that as a condition of funding the observatory, OSU was supposed to allow public access to the observatory, which they did by allowing twice monthly public sessions until 1962.

The overall observatory was funded by the donations of the benefactor Emerson McMillion, who also gave five year endowment for a Fellowship in Astronomy, and he also funded an expedition to Hawaii to observe the 1910 apparition of Halley's Comet.

== Observatory equipment ==
Items:

- 12.5 inch refractor (Brashear) on equatorial mounting
- Transit Telescope
- Zenith Telescope
- Chronograph
- Chronometer
- Sextant
- Clemens Riefler precision regulator clock
- Other astronomy items

== See also ==
- List of largest optical telescopes of the 19th century
- List of largest optical refracting telescopes
- List of observatories
