= Donald Edward Osterbrock =

American astronomer

- Born: July 13, 1924; Cincinnati, Ohio, U.S.
- Died: January 11, 2007 (aged 82); Santa Cruz, California, U.S.
- Education: University of Chicago
- Known for: star formation
- Scientific career
- Fields: astronomy
- Doctoral advisor: Subrahmanyan Chandrasekhar
- Doctoral students: Robert E. Williams

Donald Edward Osterbrock (July 13, 1924 – January 11, 2007) was an American astronomer, best known for his work on star formation and on the history of astronomy.

== Biography ==
Osterbrock was born in Cincinnati, Ohio. His father was an electrical engineer. He served with the US Army in the Second World War, making weather observations in the Pacific. He did undergraduate classes in physics at the University of Chicago as part of his weather training.

He was educated at the University of Chicago, where he received bachelor's and master's degrees in physics and a PhD in astronomy in 1952. He was a student of Subrahmanyan Chandrasekhar while working at University of Chicago's Yerkes Observatory. His work there with William Wilson Morgan and Stewart Sharpless showed the existence of the Milky Way's spiral arms.

He became a post-doctoral researcher, instructor and assistant professor at the California Institute of Technology until 1958. He was then appointed assistant professor at the University of Wisconsin–Madison, received tenure there in 1959, and was promoted to full professor in 1961. He was a Guggenheim Fellow for the academic year 1960–1961. In 1973 he moved from Madison to the University of California, Santa Cruz, as Professor of Astronomy and Astrophysics, and Director of Lick Observatory, a position he held until 1981. He remained on the faculty at UC Santa Cruz until his retirement in 1993. Thereafter, Emeritus Professor Osterbrock continued to make daily trips to his office on campus, to work on his research, to keep publishing, and to maintain an active role in the astronomical community.

At the time of his death he had authored 12 monographs on astronomy and the history of astronomy, including, in 1989 the influential textbook Astrophysics of Gaseous Nebulae and Active Galactic Nuclei, and the recently updated and revised 2nd edition (2006) written along with Gary Ferland of the University of Kentucky. Alongside his more than 150 articles on astronomy and astrophysics, he published 70 historical studies, biographical memoirs, and obituaries of major figures in nineteenth and twentieth century astronomy, and numerous book reviews.

Osterbrock's research included work on the nature of ionized gases around hot stars and studying active galactic nuclei powered by black holes.

Osterbrock received lifetime achievement awards from the American Astronomical Society and the Astronomical Society of the Pacific. He was President of the American Astronomical Society from 1988 to 1990.

He died following a heart attack. He was survived by his wife of 54 years, Irene Hansen (1926-2019), and their son and two daughters.

== Honors ==
- Member, National Academy of Sciences (1966)
- Member, American Academy of Arts and Sciences (1968)
- Member, American Philosophical Society (1991)
- Associate, Royal Astronomical Society (1976)
- Henry Norris Russell Lectureship, American Astronomical Society (1991)
- Corresponding member, Academia Mexicana de Ciencias (1998)

=== Awards ===
- University of Chicago Alumni Association Professional Achievement Award (1982)
- University Center Distinguished Scholar in Physics and Astronomy, Atlanta, Georgia (1990)
- Catherine Wolfe Bruce Gold Medal, Astronomical Society of the Pacific (1991)
- Gold Medal, Royal Astronomical Society (1997)
- Antoinette de Vancouleurs Memorial Lectureship and Medal, University of Texas (1994)
- Hans Lippershey Medal, Antique Telescope Society (1998)
- University of Chicago Alumni Medal (2000)
- Leroy E. Doggett Prize for Historical Astronomy, Historical Astronomy Division, American Astronomical Society (2002)

=== Named after him ===
- Asteroid 6107 Osterbrock
- Osterbrock Book Prize; the Donald E. Osterbrock Book Prize for Historical Astronomy is awarded biennially in odd-numbered years since 2011

=== Honorary degrees ===
- D.Sc., Ohio State University (1986)
- D.Sc., University of Chicago (1992)
- D.Sc., University of Wisconsin, Madison (1997)
- D.Sc., Ohio University (2003)
- D.Sc., University of Cincinnati (2004)
