= Aomawa Shields =

American associate professor of physics and astronomy

- Education: University of Washington; University of California, Los Angeles; Massachusetts Institute of Technology
- Awards: TED Fellow (2015); Kavli Fellow (2015)
- Scientific career
- Fields: Astronomy, Astrobiology
- Workplaces: University of California, Irvine
- Thesis: The Effect of Star-Planet Interactions on Planetary Climate
- Doctoral advisor: Cecilia Bitz and Victoria Meadows
- Website: aomawashields.com

Aomawa L. Shields is an associate professor of physics and astronomy at University of California, Irvine. Her research is focused on exploring the climate and habitability of small exoplanets, using data from observatories including NASA's Kepler space telescope. Shields was a 2015 TED Fellow, and is active in science communication and outreach. She develops interactive workshops to encourage self-esteem and teach about astronomy, combines her training in theater and her career in astronomy.

== Early life and education ==
Shields describes watching the movie Space Camp at age 12 as sparking the question "Are We Alone?" Shields attended Phillips Exeter Academy, graduating in 1993. As a student there, she and others interested in physics often rose early in the morning to look at Jupiter's moons. From Exeter, Shields attended Massachusetts Institute of Technology, gaining a degree in Earth, Atmospheric and Planetary Sciences. While she began a PhD in physics, she deferred and attended UCLA for an MFA in acting. She acted for a while, including a part in the 2005 film, Nine Lives.

However, she still felt the pull from space and science. As a day job, Shields worked at Caltech on the helpdesk operator for the Spitzer Space Telescope. Conversations on this job led her to audition and ultimately co-host for a TV Show called Wired Science, run by PBS and Wired Magazine. After exploring future careers both in science-TV hosting and interests in astronaut training, Shields realized that she would need a PhD for further growth. After an eleven-year break from her undergraduate, she attended the University of Washington, receiving a master's degree in 2011 and then a PhD in 2014 in Astronomy and Astrobiology. She was advised by Victoria Meadows and Cecilia Bitz, and her dissertation was titled, "The Effect of Star-Planet Interactions on Planetary Climate."

== Career and research ==
After receiving her PhD, Shields received an NSF Postdoctoral fellowship to work at the Center for Astrophysics | Harvard & Smithsonian. In 2016, she was awarded the Clare Boothe Luce Assistant Professorship at UC Irvine. Shields current research focuses on understanding the habitability of small, Earth-sized planets orbiting low-mass stars. She takes climate models designed for modeling the climate and weather patterns on earth, and adapts and applies these to exoplanets. Her work includes analyzing a number of factors, including the distance and type of star a planet orbits, the eccentricity and obliquity of that orbit, the atmosphere of the planet, and the rate of rotation. By exploring the parameter space of what can affect a planet's climate, scientists can narrow the candidates for sustaining life.

=== Science communication and Outreach ===
Shields has been involved in the public communication of science since before her PhD, through her role in Wired Science, as well as an appearance on the documentary, The Universe. Most recently, Shields has appeared in a NOVA episode.

Shields postdoctorate grant also funded her to develop an outreach program. Shields sought a way to encourage girls from non-traditional backgrounds to consider Astronomy as a career, using her unique background. She developed the workshop, Universe: More than Meets the Eye. This workshop is an interactive, metaphorical workshop geared toward middle school girls. It encourages them to think about how planets initial appearance may hide the actual suitability of habitation. At the same time, girls are encouraged to think more about themselves and how they see their peers.

Shields recently founded and leads Rising Stargirls, an outreach program that combines theater, writing, and visual arts with astronomy. The organization seeks to encourage girls from all different backgrounds and colors to be interested in astronomy.

Shields founded the Rising Stargirls program in 2015 to encourage middle school girls of all colours and backgrounds to explore the universe.

=== Essays and poems ===
2006: Universe: The Sequel in the Anthology She's such a geek: women write about science, technology, and other nerdy stuff

2011: Nefertiti with a Calculator

=== Awards and honours ===
2022: Kibbe Science Lecturer

2017-2020: NASA Habitable Worlds Program Grant

2016: Clare Boothe Luce Professorship

2016: The Origins Project Postdoctoral Award Lectureship

2015: Kavli Fellow

2015: TED Fellow

2014: NSF Astronomy and Astrophysics Postdoctoral Fellowship

2014: UC President's Postdoctoral Program Fellowship (2014-2015)
