= Breakthrough Listen =

Initiative to search for intelligent extraterrestrial life

Logo

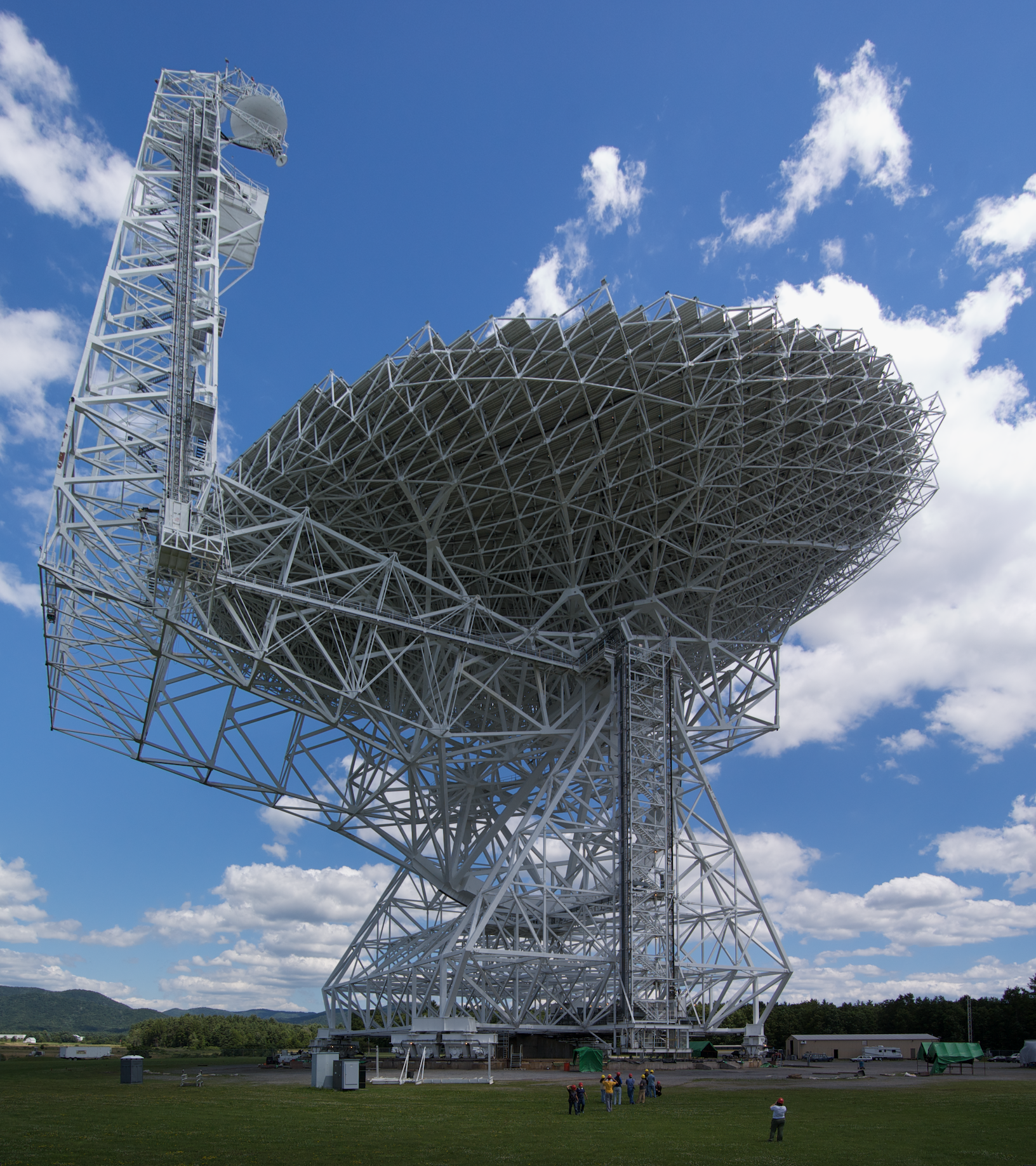
The Green Bank Telescope is one of the radio telescopes used by the project.

Breakthrough Listen was an astronomy project to search for intelligent extraterrestrial communications. With $100 million in funding and thousands of hours of dedicated telescope time on state-of-the-art facilities, it has been the most comprehensive search for alien communications to date. The project began in January 2016, and was expected to continue for 10 years. It was a component of Yuri Milner's Breakthrough Initiatives program. The science program for Breakthrough Listen was based at Berkeley SETI Research Center, located in the Astronomy Department at the University of California, Berkeley.

The project used radio wave observations from the Green Bank Observatory and the Parkes Observatory, and visible light observations from the Automated Planet Finder. Targets for the project included one million nearby stars and the centers of 100 galaxies. All data generated from the project are available to the public, and SETI@Home (BOINC) is used for some of the data analysis. The first results were published in April 2017, with further updates expected every 6 months.

== Overview ==
The project aimed to discover signs of extraterrestrial civilizations by searching stars and galaxies for radio signals and laser transmissions. The search for radio signals was carried out on the Green Bank Telescope in the Northern Hemisphere and the Parkes Telescope in the Southern Hemisphere. The Green Bank Telescope is the world's largest steerable radio telescope, and the Parkes Telescope is the second-largest steerable radio telescope in the Southern Hemisphere.

Together, the radio telescopes covered ten times more sky than previous searches and scanned the entire 1-to-10 GHz range, the so-called "quiet zone" in the spectrum where radio waves are unobscured by cosmic sources or Earth's atmosphere.

The radio telescopes are sensitive enough to detect "Earth-leakage" levels of radio transmission from stars within 5 parsecs, and can detect a transmitter of the same power as a common aircraft radar from the 1,000 nearest stars. The Green Bank Telescope began operations in January 2016, and the Parkes Telescope from October 2016. The FAST radio telescope in China also joined forces in October 2016 with the Breakthrough Initiatives to launch a coordinated search, including the rapid sharing of promising new signals for additional observation and analysis.

The search for optical laser transmissions was carried out by the Automated Planet Finder of Lick Observatory. The telescope has the sensitivity to detect a 100 watt laser from a star 25 trillion miles (4.25 light years) away.

== Announcement ==
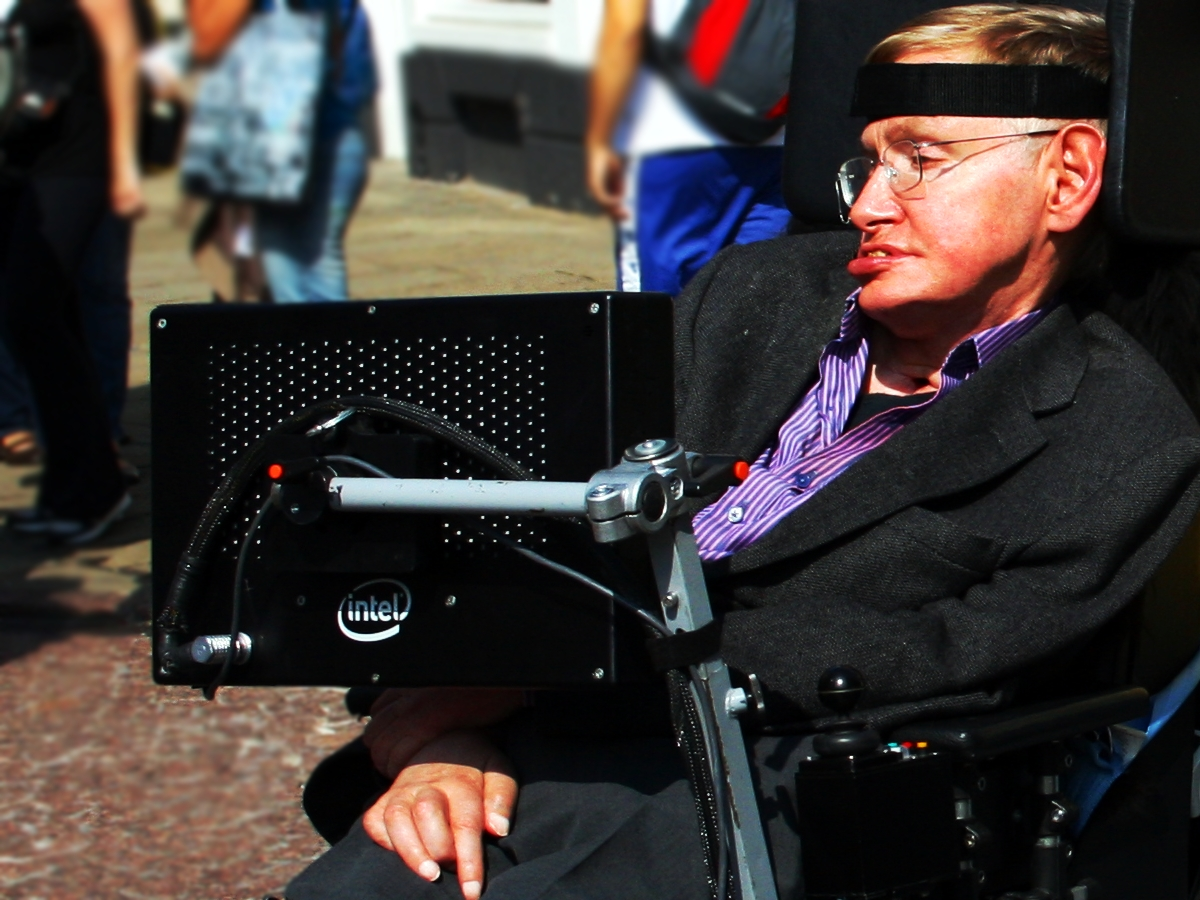
Physicist Stephen Hawking was among the scientists who co-signed an open letter of support for Breakthrough Listen.

Breakthrough Listen was announced to the public on July 20, 2015 (the anniversary of the Apollo 11 Moon landing) by Milner at London's Royal Society. The event was flanked by scientists such as Frank Drake, who is known for the Drake equation that estimates the number of detectable alien civilizations, and Geoff Marcy, an astronomer who has helped find hundreds of exoplanets. The announcement included an open letter co-signed by multiple scientists, including physicist Stephen Hawking, expressing support for an intensified search for alien life. During the public launch, Hawking said:

In an infinite Universe, there must be other life. There is no bigger question. It is time to commit to finding the answer.

== Significance ==
The project has been the most comprehensive search for alien communications to date. It has been estimated that the project would generate as much data in one day as previous SETI projects generated in one year. Compared to previous programs, the radio surveys covered 10 times more of the sky, at least 5 times more of the radio spectrum, and work 100 times faster. The optical laser survey was also the deepest and broadest search in history.

Andrew Siemion, director of the Berkeley SETI Research Center at the University of California, Berkeley, describes that "We would typically get 24–36 hours on a telescope per year, but now we'll have thousands of hours per year on the best instruments...It's difficult to overstate how big this is. It's a revolution."

== Targets ==
As of April 2016, the targets for the radio search with the Green Bank Radio Telescope in the Northern Hemisphere included the following:

- All 43 stars within 5 parsec, or 16.3 light-years, or 1.03 million astronomical units, or 1.545×10^{14} kilometres
- 1000 stars of all spectral-types within 50 pc, or 163 ly, or 10.3 million au, or 1.545×10^{15} km
- One million nearby stars
- Center regions of at least 100 nearby galaxies, including spiral galaxies, elliptical galaxies, dwarf galaxies and irregular galaxies
- Exotic stars: 20 white dwarfs, 20 neutron stars, 20 black holes

The Parkes Radio Telescope was expected to cover similar targets in the Southern Hemisphere from 1–4 GHz, and also the galactic plane and center.

The targets for the Automated Planet Finder were expected to closely match those of the Green Bank radio search, with small adjustments due to the telescope's much smaller field of view.

While the telescopes were observing, the targets of the Green Bank Radio Telescope and the Automated Planet Finder could be viewed live at the Berkeley Seti Research Center.

In January 2017, the project published its initial targets, which are the 60 nearest stars and a further 1649 stars which are the closest representatives of each spectral type. The initial targets also include 123 galaxies which cover all morphological types of galaxies.

In October 2019 it was announced that Breakthrough Listen would collaborate with scientists from NASA's Transiting Exoplanet Survey Satellite (TESS) team. Over a thousand new planets found by TESS would be scanned for technosignatures. The search used Listen's primary facilities (Green Bank and Parkes Telescopes, MeerKAT, and the Automated Planet Finder) as well as partner facilities (including VERITAS, NenuFAR, FAST, the Murchison Widefield Array, LOFAR stations in Ireland and Sweden, Jodrell Bank Observatory, e-MERLIN, Keck Observatory, Sardinia Radio Telescope, along with the Allen Telescope Array). In addition to targeting of TESS planets with Listen facilities, the TESS lightcurves themselves were to be searched for anomalies, for example caused by megastructures.

== Breakthrough Listen Exotica Catalog ==
Breakthrough Listen Exotica Catalog is a list of 700 targets that were chosen "to include "one of everything" in the observed Universe – ranging from comets to galaxies, from mundane objects to the most rare and violent celestial phenomena".

There are four types of targets in the catalog:

1. "Prototypes: a list containing at least one example of every known kind of celestial object (apart from those too transient to present realistic observation targets). Planets and moons, stars at every point of their life cycle, galaxies big and small, serene star clusters and blazing quasars, and more are all included in the list."
2. "Superlatives: objects with the most extreme properties. These include examples like the hottest planet, stars with unusually high or low metal content, the most distant quasar and fastest-spinning pulsar, and the densest galaxy."
3. "Anomalies: enigmatic targets whose behavior is currently not satisfactorily explained. For instance, the famous "Tabby's Star" with its bizarre dimming behavior; ʻOumuamua – the interstellar object that passed near Earth in 2017; unexplained optical pulses that last mere nanoseconds; and stars with excess infrared radiation that could conceivably be explained as waste heat from alien megastructures."
4. A control sample of sources not expected to produce positive results.

== Data processing ==
Analyzing radio observations for possible signals requires intensive data analysis to cover all of the possible signal types. To carry out an in-depth search, the data recorder at the Green Bank telescope has been significantly upgraded. The system records 6 GHz of bandwidth at 24GB of data per second, making it among the highest data rate recording systems in radio astronomy, and there is a plan to double its capabilities in the near future. Once this data has been recorded, it is analysed for signals using a computing cluster with 64 GTX 1080 GPUs. The raw data is reduced to a lower resolution to allow long-term storage, but even this reduced data totals approximately 1 petabyte per year.

All data generated from Breakthrough Listen project will be open to the public. The data is uploaded on the initiative's Open Data Archive, where any user can download it for software analysis. Breakthrough Initiatives are developing open source software to assist users in understanding and analyzing the data, which are available on GitHub under UCBerkeleySETI.

The data is also processed by the SETI@home (BOINC) volunteer computer network, with the first batch of data being made available to SETI@home in April 2016.

== Funding ==
The project was funded with $100 million from the foundation co-founded by Yuri Milner. One third of this funding was used to purchase telescope time. In 2016, the project had signed contracts for around 20 percent of the time on the Green Bank Telescope for the next five years, and 25 percent of the time on the Parkes Telescope. Another third was used for the development of new equipment to receive and process potential signals, and the final third was used to hire astronomy staff.

== Project leadership ==
Among the projects leaders are:

- Frank Drake, chairman emeritus, SETI Institute; professor emeritus of astronomy and astrophysics, University of California, Santa Cruz; founding director, National Astronomy and Ionosphere Center; former Goldwin Smith Professor of Astronomy, Cornell University.
- Ann Druyan, creative director of the Voyager Interstellar Message, NASA Voyager; co-founder and CEO, Cosmos Studios; Emmy Award- and Peabody Award-winning writer and producer.
- Martin Rees, Astronomer Royal, Fellow of Trinity College; emeritus professor of cosmology and astrophysics, University of Cambridge.
- Andrew Siemion, director, Berkeley SETI Research Center.
- Dan Werthimer, co-founder and chief scientist of the SETI@home project; director of SERENDIP; principal investigator for CASPER.
- Pete Worden, chairman, Breakthrough Prize Foundation.

== Results ==
- In April 2017, the project released its first set of results, covering the observations of 692 nearby stars at frequencies from 1.1–1.9 GHz (the L-band). These observations included 11 events which passed the threshold for significance, but it was concluded that they were all consistent with radio frequency interference. A summary of the observations and the raw data relating to them has been published online. The project plans to continue publishing updated results approximately every 6 months.

The project has begun at lower frequencies as these have a lower frequency range which is easier to record and process, and plans eventually to observe in a wide range of frequencies from 1.15 GHz to 93 GHz.

- On August 30, 2017, Breakthrough Listen said it picked a series of 15 radio bursts coming from a dwarf galaxy about 3 billion light years away. Breakthrough Listen researchers said the possibility of the source being extraterrestrial life cannot yet be ruled out. The radio emissions were detected by the Green Bank Telescope in West Virginia. The source is FRB 121102 which was already known but the activity was vastly different in the latest findings.
- In December 2017, Breakthrough Listen observed ʻOumuamua, an interstellar asteroid with an unusually elongated shape, for any signs of radio emissions. Over eight hours of observing over a range of frequencies from 1.1–11.6 GHz, no emissions were detected.
- In December 2018, a search for laser light emissions from Boyajian's Star was carried out using the Automated Planet Finder, which is sensitive enough to detect a 24 MW laser at this distance. Although a number of candidates were identified, further analysis showed that they are coming from the Earth and not from the star.
- In January 2020, a preliminary results for the nearby (<150 parsecs away) stars were announced, with no positive detections of artificial transmitters comparable to the terrestrial Arecibo Observatory in the 3.95-8.00 GHz band. Also, it was concluded that at least 8% of 252 nearby stars in a zone allowing detection of Earth by occultation method do not have the 100%-duty (artificial) transmitters of the sort sought by the survey.
- In December 2020, it was reported that in April and May 2019, a narrowband signal at 982.002 MHz was intercepted that showed shifts in its frequency consistent with the movement of a planet. No modulation was detected. The signal appears to have originated from the direction of Proxima Centauri. It has been given the name Breakthrough Listen Candidate 1 (BLC1). As of December 2020, the researchers were still working to rule out terrestrial interference, which they considered the most likely cause. One researcher called it "on par" with the Wow! signal.
- In May 2022, Breakthrough Listen conducted the first targeted search for the Wow! Signal. It was its first collaboration between the Green Bank Telescope and the SETI Institute's Allen Telescope Array. The observations lasted 1 hour from Greenbank, 35 minutes from ATA, and 10 minutes simultaneously. No technosignature candidates were found.
- Breakthrough Listen filtered two million detections of 3I/ATLAS as it passed through the solar system in 2025 to identify 211 signals of interest. None of those signals indicated that the interstellar object was non-natural.

== See also ==
- Communication with extraterrestrial intelligence
- Detecting Earth from distant stars – Detecting Earth as an exoplanet
- List of nearest stars and brown dwarfs within 20 light years
- Nexus for Exoplanet System Science
- Ohio State University Radio Observatory
- Open data, Open-source software
- Search for extraterrestrial intelligence
- SETI Institute
