= Planet finder =

Planet finder may refer to:

- Terrestrial Planet Finder, a NASA project for a telescope system to detect extrasolar terrestrial planets
- Automated Planet Finder, a telescope at Lick Observatory, California
