= Human Rights Measurement Initiative =

New Zealand human rights organization

- Founded: 2016; 10 years ago
- Website: humanrightsmeasurement.org

The Human Rights Measurement Initiative (HRMI) is a non-profit organisation primarily housed in Wellington, New Zealand. It was established in 2016 by Anne-Marie Brook, K. Chad Clay, and Susan Randolph, experts in human rights and economics, who noticed a gap in easily accessible and understandable human rights data. HRMI produces a free database of metrics, summarizing human rights performance in countries around the world. They believe that with a good set of measures, it will be easier to improve human rights around the world. It is funded by grants and donations.

== Methodology ==
HRMI's database of metrics can be found and explored using the Rights Tracker. Using the Rights Tracker, one can explore performance for individual countries, rights, or specific people groups at risk for having their rights violated.

HRMI currently measures a total of 13 human rights, including Quality of Life Rights, Safety from the State Rights, and Empowerment Rights. They aim to continuously expand their measurement by producing metrics that cover the full range of rights embodied in international law, particularly the collection of international treaties known as the International Bill of Human Rights.

The Human Rights Measurement Initiative's approach to measuring civil and political rights is unique to the human rights field. They rely on a peer-reviewed methodology drawing on a multilingual survey of human rights experts from around the world. This approach works to solve the difficulty of measuring civil and political rights by getting information directly from the human rights researchers and practitioners who are monitoring events in each country. Their economic and social rights data comes from the Social and Economic Rights Fulfillment (SERF) Index, developed by Sakiko Fukuda-Parr, Terra Lawson-Remer, and Susan Randolph. In 2019, their methodology was awarded the Grawemeyer Award for Ideas Improving World Order. This data is constructed from internationally comparable, publicly available, objective data, such as statistics on infant mortality and school enrollment.

== Impact ==
HRMI data has been cited by publications including Reuters, The Guardian and Al Jazeera. Additionally, HRMI's data has been used by various academic publications, advocacy and government reports, human rights institutes, and more.
