= ETZ =

ETZ may refer to:

== Places ==
- Metz-Nancy-Lorraine Airport

== Science ==
- Earth Transit Zone

== Time zones ==
- Eastern Time Zone (in the Americas), UTC-5 or UTC-4
- Australian Eastern Time Zone, UTC+10 or UTC+11
- Brazilian Eastern Time Zone, UTC-2

== Politics ==
- Jerusalem Faction
