= Sarah Rugheimer =

American astrobiologist and astrophysicist

Sarah Rugheimer is a British-Swiss-American astrobiologist and astrophysicist at the School of Physics and Astronomy with the University of Edinburgh. Her research focuses on the atmospheric composition of exoplanets, and ways of detecting life.

== Education ==
Rugheimer earned her bachelor's degree in physics at the University of Calgary. She completed her master's degree and PhD in Astronomy and Astrophysics at Harvard University. Her thesis topic involved studying biomarkers and modelling the atmosphere of exoplanets, using space-based telescopes.

In 2014, she was one of eight finalists selected for Harvard's Horizon Scholars. She delivered a five-minute talk on her PhD thesis, "Spectral Fingerprints of Another Earth", at the 2014 Harvard Horizons Symposium.

== Career ==
In 2015, Rugheimer worked at the Carl Sagan Institute, and was the lead author of a study that produced models of Earth-like planets. For two years from 2016, she was a Simons Origins of Life Research Fellow at the University of St Andrews, where her research explored biosignature gases.

From 2019 to 2022, Rugheimer was a Glasstone Research Fellow and Hugh Price Fellow at Clarendon Laboratory, part of the Department of Physics, University of Oxford, and a senior research fellow at Jesus College, Oxford.

In 2022, she became an associate professor at York University and also held the Allan I. Carswell Chair for the public understanding of Astronomy.

Since 2025, Rugheimer has been a Chancellor's Fellow and Reader at the Institute for Astronomy with the University of Edinburgh

=== Research ===
Rugheimer's research focuses on atmospheric biosignatures (signs of life) on Earth-like planets, as well as Earth's early atmosphere. She is particularly interested in star-planet interactions and how the UV environment of a host star affects the atmosphere of planets.

"I am confident life exists elsewhere in the universe. But confidence isn’t enough. Over the next few years, our searches are going to become more accurate, more thorough and capable of looking further than before. The answers we find stand to fundamentally shift our understanding of the universe and our place in it."

=== Awards ===
After completing her PhD in 2015, Rugheimer received a three-year Simons Origin of Life Fellowship, which she undertook at the University of St. Andrews.

In 2018, she was the 2018 Caroline Herschel Prize winner for Promising Female Junior Astronomer in the UK.

In 2019, Rugheimer was awarded the Rosalind Franklin Award Lecture for Physical Sciences and Mathematics by the British Science Association.

In 2019, Astrobiology Society of Britain awarded Rugheimer with The Barrie Jones Award Lecture for her achievements in astrobiology-related outreach, teaching and mentoring in the field of astrobiology.

Rugheimer is one of the TED Fellows in 2020.

== Personal life ==
Rugheimer's father was a physics teacher and she credits him for her love of teaching.

She has stated that she did not have a strong interest in astronomy, until she heard about astrobiology at the American Astronomical Society (AAS) conference in her final undergraduate year.

"I had never heard anything more exciting. Finally science is beginning to being able to start answering humanity’s most fundamental questions of how we got here, and is there life elsewhere in the Universe? Are we alone? These are basic fundamental questions we have been thinking about for thousands of years".

Rugheimer co-hosts a podcast, "Self-care with Drs. Sarah", which covers topics such as women in science and navigating academic careers.

She competed internationally in Irish dance for 11 years. In 2011, Rugheimer climbed Mt. Kilimanjaro and since climbed mountains across the world including Aconcagua, Cayambe, Chimborazo, Mt. Rainier and Mt. Baker.

One of the major influences on Rugheimer in her younger years while studying at the University of Calgary was Dr. Jay Gamble, the Professor for her Fantasy Literature class.
