= Breakthrough Listen Pulsar =

Millisecond pulsar candidate in the constellation Sagittarius

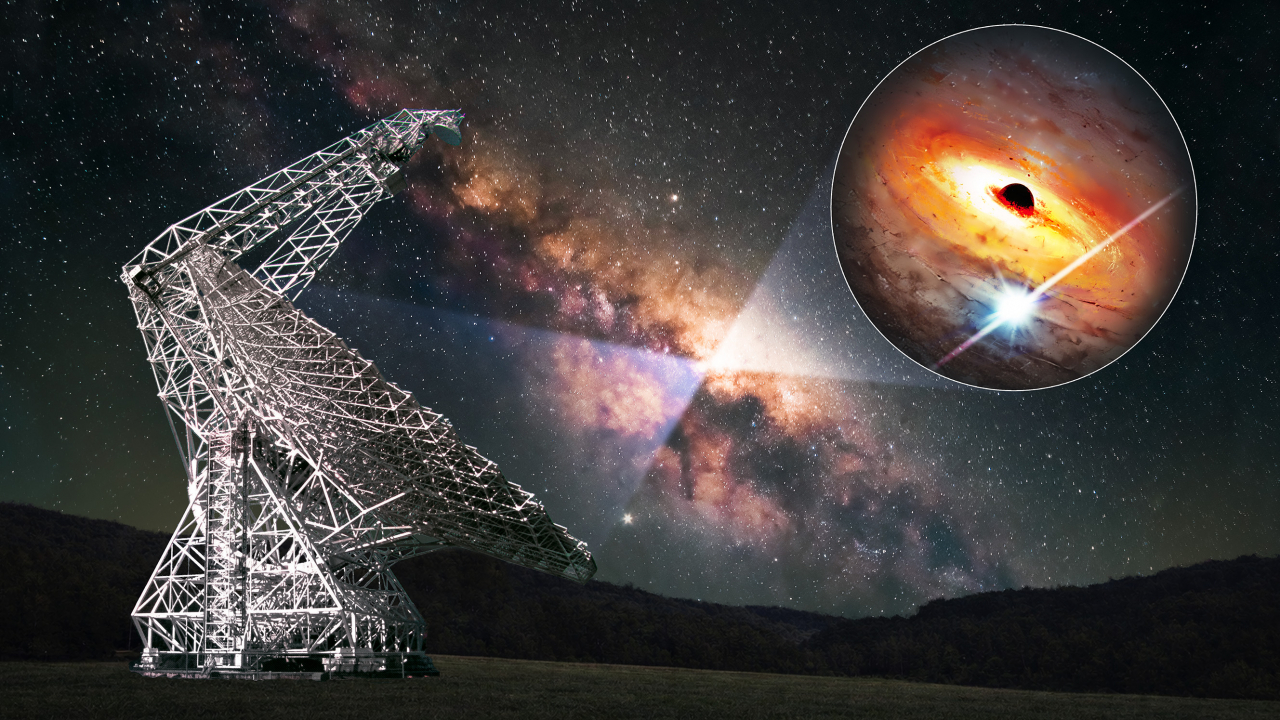
- Artist’s impression of the NSF Green Bank Telescope gathering data on the center of the Milky Way. The inset image shows the black hole at our Galaxy’s center, and a nearby candidate (unconfirmed) pulsar.

Observation data Epoch J2000 Equinox ICRS
- Constellation: Sagittarius
- Right ascension: 17^{h} 45^{m} 40.04^{s}
- Declination: −29° 00′ 28.1″

Characteristics
- Spectral type: MSP

Astrometry
Distance	28,017 - 36,954 ly (8,590 - 11,330 pc)

Details
Rotation	8.196531 ms

Other designations
- Breakthrough Listen Pulsar, BLPSR

Breakthrough Listen Pulsar (also known as BLPSR) is a candidate millisecond pulsar located in close proximity to the Galactic Center of the Milky Way. It was discovered in early 2026 as part of the Breakthrough Listen project, which aims to search for extraterrestrial intelligence and explore extreme astrophysical environments. If the object's existence is confirmed, it will become the first known millisecond pulsar in the Galactic Center.

== Discovery ==
The pulsar was discovered as a result of processing data obtained during the Breakthrough Listen Galactic Center Survey. The initial observational data were collected by the 100-meter Green Bank Telescope in the radio spectrum at L-band frequencies (around 1.5 GHz). Astronomers conducted a continuous 20-hour observation session focused on the dynamic center of the Galaxy.

Due to the high density of interstellar gas and dust in the direction of Sagittarius A*, the search for periodic signals required the application of specialized dedispersion algorithms to compensate for the delay of radio waves in the interstellar plasma. The signal showed an extremely high measure of dispersion of the order of 2775 pc/cm³, confirming its location in the deep layers of the galactic nucleus. The analysis of the data arrays was performed by an international team of researchers. In February 2026, a team led by astrophysicist Karen Perez completed the computer processing and verification of the waveform profile. The candidate's pulsation period was 8.19 milliseconds, corresponding to approximately 122 rotations per second. The results of the discovery and a detailed analysis of the candidate's characteristics were officially published in the peer-reviewed scientific journal The Astrophysical Journal.

== Distance ==
The precise distance to BLPSR is not definitively determined due to the inhomogeneity of the interstellar plasma, which affects data interpretation. Estimates derived from two major three-dimensional models of the Galaxy's electron density vary significantly.

According to the NE2001 model, the distance is 8.59 kpc, approximately 28,017 light-years. This figure suggests the object is located within the Galactic Center of the Milky Way.

According to the YMW16 model, the distance is estimated at 11.33 kpc, about 36,954 light-years. This number places the candidate beyond the dynamic center, on the far side of the galactic disk.

Astronomers use both values to denote the upper and lower bounds of the possible distance to the object.

== Current Status ==
At present, BLPSR is officially classified solely as a candidate. The statistical significance of the folded signal profile is at a relatively low level, around 3σ. During a 20-hour observation session, the candidate's radio emission gradually faded, which could indicate either internal physical processes within the pulsar, or fluctuations in the interstellar medium, or instrumental noise.

The observational data has been made publicly available for independent analysis by the global astronomical community. Confirmation or refutation of the object's nature is expected after subsequent monitoring sessions, including those using next-generation radio telescope systems under construction, such as the Square Kilometre Array.
