= Oran Young =

Environmental governance scholar

Oran R. Young
- Born: 1941 (age 84–85)
- Known for: Research on Arctic governance and environmental institutions
- Awards: IASC Medal (2018); International Mohn Prize (2024)

Academic background
- Education: Harvard University (BA); Yale University (MA, PhD)

Academic work
- Discipline: Environmental policy, international relations
- Sub-discipline: Arctic governance, environmental institutions
- Institutions: Dartmouth College, University of California, Santa Barbara

Oran Reed Young (born 1941) is an American scholar of international governance, environmental policy, and environmental governance. Currently a distinguished professor emeritus at the Bren School of Environmental Science and Management of the University of California, Santa Barbara, Young's work has focused on environmental institutions and climate change in the Arctic and in China, with research into collective choice and social institutions. He is a founder of University of the Arctic, and has received awards from the International Arctic Science Committee and The Arctic University of Norway for his research in the region.

== Early life and education ==
Young was born in 1941. He attended Harvard University for a BA degree in government, followed by an MA and PhD in international relations from Yale University. His PhD dissertation was entitled Third Party Intervention in International Crises.

== Career ==
Young was a research associate at Princeton University in the mid-1960s. He was awarded a Guggenheim Fellowship in political science in 1968; he was also appointed at Dartmouth College that year. At Dartmouth, he served as a professor of environmental studies and in 1989 founded the Institute of Arctic Studies. During the 1970s, he also taught at the University of Texas at Austin and the University of Maryland, College Park. He joined the faculty of the Bren School at UC Santa Barbara in January 2003.

Young was the founding chair of the Committee on the Human Dimensions of Global Change of the National Academy of Sciences. He has also served as steering committee chair of the Arctic Governance Project and as co-chair of the Arctic Human Development Report, published in 2004. Young is also a co-founder of University of the Arctic, and was its first board chair.

Though he is best known for his research in the Arctic, Young also studies environmental issues in China; in academic year 2012–2013, he served as a visiting professor at Nanjing University. He advocates for the United States and China to form a coalition to break deadlock on greenhouse gas emissions and climate change.

In 2018, the International Arctic Science Committee awarded Young the annual IASC Medal. An international collaboration between the Academia Borealis, Tromsø Research Foundation, and Arctic University of Norway awarded Young the 2024 biannual International Mohn Prize for Outstanding Research Related to the Arctic.

At the time of his retirement to emeritus status, Young held the title of distinguished professor at UCSB.

=== Contributions ===
Early in his career, Young published on international relations and cooperation. He began to focus on Arctic environmental issues in the 1970s, and in 1977 first became recognized as the "godfather" of global environmental governance with the publication of his book Resource Management at the International Level: The Case of the North Pacific.

Young says that governance does not necessarily require the creation of a government. He defines governance as "the social function steering or guiding societies toward socially or collectively desirable outcomes and away from undesirable outcomes, avoiding things like the 'tragedy of the commons'". He advocates for a "regime complex" to govern the Arctic as "a network of distinct regime elements that operate simultaneously in the broad issue area of Arctic governance" and for strengthening and enhancement of the Arctic Council.

== Personal life ==
Young married Marit Varnik in 1965. In circa 1978 he married filmmaker and environmental lawyer Gail Osherenko. In 2012, Young and Osherenko donated an easement of land in Wolcott, Vermont, to the Vermont Land Trust. During the 2008 and 2009 Tea and Jesusita Fires, the couple evacuated form their condominium in Santa Barbara; Young used the fires as an example of global climate change's impacts.

== Works ==
As of 2013, he had published at least 16 single-author books, edited 11 volumes, and written 60 articles. Selected books include:

- Young, Oran R. (2010). Institutional Dynamics: Emergent Patterns in International Environmental Governance. MIT Press.
- Young, Oran R. (1994). International Governance: Protecting the Environment in a Stateless Society. Cornell University Press.
- Young, Oran R. (1992). Arctic Politics: Conflict and Cooperation in the Circumpolar North. University Press of New England.
- Young, Oran R. (1981). Natural Resources and the State: The Political Economy of Resource Management. University of California Press.
