= Nexus for Exoplanet System Science =

Dedicated to the search for life on exoplanets

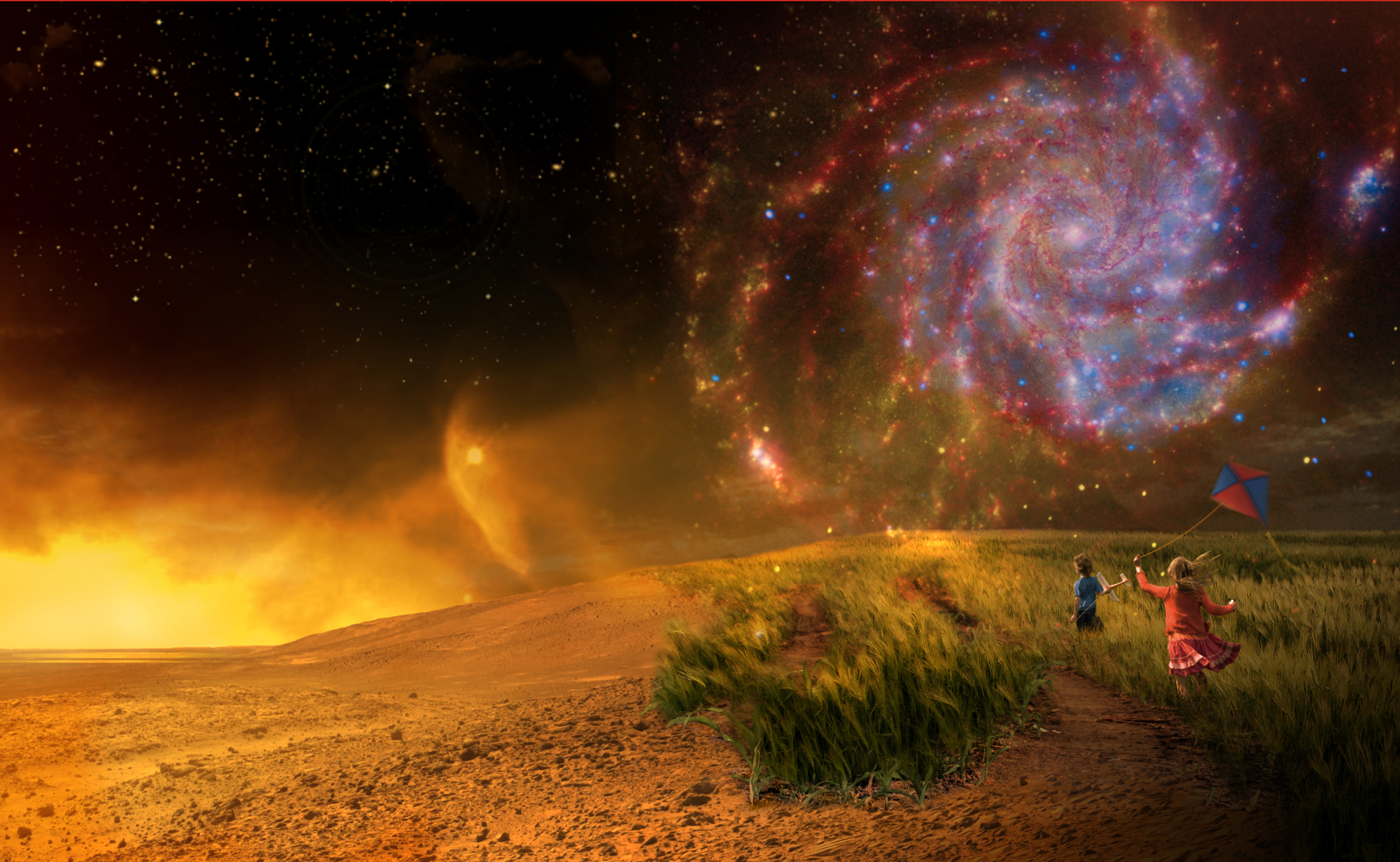
- NExSS poster
- Abbreviation: NExSS
- Formation: 2015
- Legal status: Active
- Purpose: To search for life beyond the Solar System
- Headquarters: NASA Ames Research Center; NASA Exoplanet Science Institute; Goddard Institute for Space Studies
- Parent organization: NASA
- Budget: US$10–12 million
- Website: NExSS

The Nexus for Exoplanet System Science (NExSS) initiative is a National Aeronautics and Space Administration (NASA) virtual institute designed to foster interdisciplinary collaboration in the search for life on exoplanets. Led by the Ames Research Center, the NASA Exoplanet Science Institute, and the Goddard Institute for Space Studies, NExSS will help organize the search for life on exoplanets from participating research teams and acquire new knowledge about exoplanets and extrasolar planetary systems.

== History ==
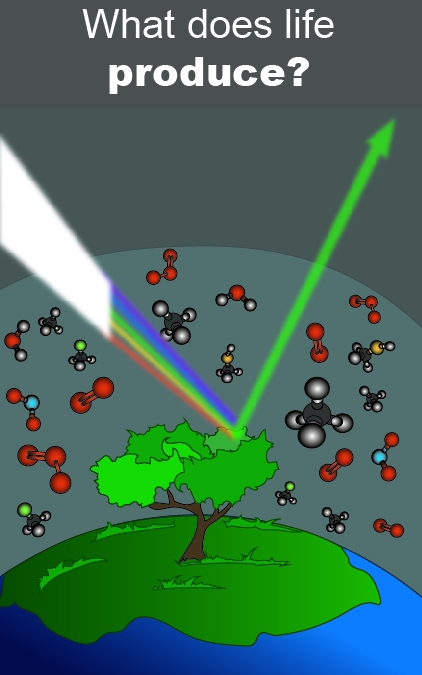
What does life produce?

In 1995, astronomers using ground-based observatories discovered 51 Pegasi b, the first exoplanet orbiting a Sun-like star. NASA launched the Kepler space telescope in 2009 to search for Earth-size exoplanets. By 2015, they had confirmed more than a thousand exoplanets, (Note: There are 6,534 confirmed exoplanets as of October 8, 2026.) while several thousand additional candidates awaited confirmation.

To help coordinate efforts to sift through and understand the data, NASA needed a way for researchers to collaborate across disciplines. The success of the Virtual Planetary Laboratory research network at the University of Washington led Mary A. Voytek, director of the NASA Astrobiology Program, to model its structure and create the Nexus for Exoplanet System Science (NExSS) initiative. Leaders from three NASA research centers will run the program: Natalie Batalha of NASA's Ames Research Center, Dawn Gelino of the NASA Exoplanet Science Institute, and Anthony Del Genio of NASA's Goddard Institute for Space Studies.

== Research ==
Functioning as a virtual institute, NExSS is currently composed of sixteen interdisciplinary science teams from ten universities, three NASA centers and two research institutes, who will work together to search for habitable exoplanets that can support life. The US teams were initially selected from a total of about 200 proposals; however, the coalition is expected to expand nationally and internationally as the project gets underway. Teams will also work with amateur citizen scientists who will have the ability to access the public Kepler data and search for exoplanets.

NExSS will draw from scientific expertise in each of the four divisions of the Science Mission Directorate: Earth science, planetary science, heliophysics and astrophysics. NExSS research will directly contribute to understanding and interpreting future exoplanet data from the upcoming launches of the Transiting Exoplanet Survey Satellite and James Webb Space Telescope, as well as the planned Nancy Grace Roman Space Telescope mission.

Current NExSS research projects as of 2015:

Subject	PI	Institution	Description	Notes
Planetary formation and properties	James Graham	University of California, Berkeley; Stanford University	"Exoplanets Unveiled"; Direct imaging, Doppler and transit methods, using the Gemini Planet Imager of the Gemini South Telescope, the Keck Observatory, and the proposed Thirty Meter Telescope.	
Stellar proximity and Earth-like planet formation	Daniel Apai	University of Arizona	"Earths in Other Solar Systems"; development of computer model; Large Binocular Telescope	
Planetary formation	Eric Ford	Penn State University	Statistical models applied to Kepler data	
Atmospheres of Hot Jupiters	Jason Wright	Penn State University	Diffuser-assisted photometry using ground based observatories	
Chemistry of planetary atmospheres	Hiroshi Imanaka	SETI Institute	Habitable zones; atmosphere of Titan as an analogue to exoplanet atmospheres	
Geochemical cycle of exoplanets	Steven Desch	Arizona State University	"Periodic Table of Planets"; geochemical modeling	
Atmospheres of exoplanets	Drake Deming	University of Maryland	Analysis of Kepler data to study exoplanet atmospheres	
Atmospheric evolution	William B. Moore	Hampton University	"Living, Breathing Planet". Determine past habitability of planets in the Solar System and apply results to exoplanetary habitability	
Atmospheric structure and spectra of exoplanets	Jonathan Fortney	University of California, Santa Cruz	New tools to analyze exoplanet transmission spectra to identify molecular features in the atmosphere	
Planetary formation and evolution	Hannah Jang-Condell	University of Wyoming	Modeling planet formation, focusing on transitional, protostellar disks	
Formation of exoplanets	Neal Turner	Jet Propulsion Laboratory	Computer modeling of exoplanet formation	
Exoplanet exospheres	Adam Jensen	University of Nebraska-Kearney	Detection and evolution of exospheres	
Habitable exoplanets	Victoria Meadows	University of Washington	Virtual Planetary Laboratory (VPL)	
Planetary surface habitability	Anthony Del Genio	Goddard Institute for Space Studies	Planet simulation using the GISS Earth global climate model	
Tidal dynamics and orbital evolution of terrestrial exoplanets	Wade Henning	University of Maryland, College Park; Goddard Space Flight Center	Study of how tidal heating can prevent the ejection of young, Earth-sized planets	
Detection of Earth-size exoplanets	Debra Fischer	Yale University	Design new spectrometer to detect Earth-size exoplanets; improve access to citizen science with Planet Hunters	

== See also ==
- Astrobiology – Science concerned with life in the universe
- Astrochemistry – Study of molecules in the Universe and their reactions
- Center for Life Detection Science – Institute dedicated to the scientific search of extraterrestrial life
- Cosmochemistry – Study of the chemical composition of matter in the universe
- Carl Sagan Institute – Institute for the search of habitable worlds
- Detecting Earth from distant stars – Detecting Earth as an exoplanet
- Earliest known life forms
- Extraterrestrial atmospheres – Area of astronomical research
- Extraterrestrial liquid water – Liquid water naturally occurring outside Earth
- Hypothetical types of biochemistry – Possible alternative biochemicals used by life forms
- Planetary habitability – Known extent to which a planet is suitable for life
