= Virtual Planetary Laboratory =

Institute that studies exoplanetary habitability

- Abbreviation: VPL
- Formation: 2001
- Legal status: Active
- Purpose: To detect exoplanetary habitability and their potential biosignatures.
- Parent organization: NASA
- Website: depts.washington.edu/naivpl

The Virtual Planetary Laboratory (VPL) is a virtual institute based at the University of Washington that studies how to detect exoplanetary habitability and their potential biosignatures. First formed in 2001, the VPL is part of the NASA Astrobiology Institute (NAI) and connects more than fifty researchers at twenty institutions together in an interdisciplinary effort. VPL is also part of the Nexus for Exoplanet System Science (NExSS) network, with principal investigator Victoria Meadows leading the NExSS VPL team.

== Research ==
=== Task A: Solar System Analogs for Extrasolar Planet Observations ===
The first task considers observations of the Solar System planets, moons, and the asteroid belt to explore processes necessary for habitable environments and for exoplanet model confirmation. Specifically, observations of Europa, Venus, Earth, Mars, and the asteroid belt have helped researchers in Task A address their goals.

=== Task B: The Earth Through Time ===
Our only data point of a habitable planet today is Earth, although it has not always been habitable. The Early Earth serves as an example of an exoplanet. The VPL research has contributed to the understanding of our early planet. Task B combines geological and biological data with ecosystem and photo-chemical models to showcase how planet Earth has changed throughout its history.

=== Task C: The Habitable Planet ===
This task uses observational data, models and orbital dynamics to explore the distribution of habitable worlds in the universe. The VPL team studies the effects of galactic, stellar, and planetary environments on planetary habitability.

=== Task D: The Living Planet ===
Task D incorporates VPL researchers from diverse and interdisciplinary fields who use laboratory work combined with chemical and climate models to study the impact of life on its environment. In addition, the interactions between the biosphere, planet, and host star are explored to determine how they can influence detectable biosignatures.

=== Task E: The Observer ===
In the final task, the VPL scientists observe the Solar System and extrasolar planets. The goal of this task is to develop astronomical and remote-sensing retrieval methods. In addition, VPL members use telescope and instrument simulators to study which measurements, observing strategies, and analysis techniques are necessary for the characterization of exoplanets.

== Models ==
1D Radiative Convective and Photochemical Models

Solar Flux Model

Habitable Zone Calculator

== Education & Outreach ==
Students

Teachers

== VPL in the News ==
February 2017 - Early Earth as a proxy for hazy exoplanets

August 2016 - Is Proxima Centauri b habitable?

== See also ==
- Astrobiology
- Astrochemistry
- Cosmochemistry
- Extraterrestrial atmospheres
- Extraterrestrial liquid water
- Planetary habitability
