= Andrew Siemion =

American astrophysicist (born 1980)

- Siemion at the GeekPark 2018 Innovation Festival (Beijing, China)
- Born: Andrew Patrick Vincent Siemion; August 9, 1980 (age 46)
- Education: A.B., University of California at Berkeley, 2008; M.A., University of California at Berkeley, 2010; Ph.D., University of California at Berkeley, 2012
- Known for: Director of the Berkeley SETI Research Center, Bernard M. Oliver Chair for SETI at the SETI Institute
- Spouse: Mai-Chi Hoang
- Scientific career
- Fields: Astrophysics, astronomy, radio astronomy
- Workplaces: University of California, Berkeley; SETI Institute
- Thesis: Searches for Exotic Radio Sources and Intelligent Life on Other Worlds (2012)
- Website: seti.berkeley.edu

Andrew Patrick Vincent Siemion is an astrophysicist and director of the Berkeley SETI Research Center. His research interests include high energy time-variable celestial phenomena, astronomical instrumentation and the search for extraterrestrial intelligence (SETI). Andrew Siemion is the Principal Investigator for the Breakthrough Listen program.

Siemion received a B.A. degree in 2008, an M.A. degree in 2010, and a Ph.D. degree in 2012, all in astrophysics from the University of California, Berkeley. In 2018, Siemion was named the Bernard M. Oliver Chair for SETI at the SETI Institute. Siemion is jointly affiliated with Radboud University Nijmegen and the University of Malta. Also in 2018, he was elected to the International Academy of Astronautics as a Corresponding Member for Basic Sciences. In September 2015, Siemion testified on the current status of astrobiology to the House Committee on Science, Space, and Technology of the United States Congress.

== Media appearances ==
Siemion regularly appears on television, radio, and other media outlets discussing the search for extraterrestrial intelligence, astrobiology and astrophysics. He has appeared on Space's Deepest Secrets, Through the Wormhole, Horizon and Aliens: The Definitive Guide.
