= Marika Holland =

Climate scientist (born 1968)

Marika M. Holland
- Education: University of Colorado Boulder (BA, MA, PhD)
- Awards: MacArthur Fellowship (2026)
- Scientific career
- Workplaces: National Center for Atmospheric Research
- Thesis: Climate change and variability in a single column coupled sea ice/ocean mixed layer model (1997)

Marika Holland (born 1968) is a scientist at the National Center for Atmospheric Research known for her work on modeling sea ice and its role in the global climate. She received a Macarthur Fellowship in 2026.

== Education and career ==
Holland attended the University of Colorado Boulder, where she earned a Bachelor of Arts in 1990, a Master of Arts in 1994, and a doctorate in 1997. She was a postdoctoral fellow at the University of Victoria until 1999, when she joined the staff at the National Center for Atmospheric Research (NCAR). Holland was Chief Scientist for the Community Earth System Model (CESM) from 2012 until 2014 and received the CESM Distinguished Achievement Award for her work in 2014.

== Research ==
Holland is known for her research predicting sea ice on different time scales. Holland's modeling of sea ice began with considerations of the processes that define the actions of sea ice in climate models. In 2003, Holland and Cecilia Bitz modeled how changes in the Arctic climate alter the degree of polar amplification in climate models. Holland's work on future sea ice predict an ice-free Arctic Ocean by 2040, research that was broadly covered in the news. Research by Holland and others then showed that sea ice was declining faster than the predictions. Holland has also worked with biologists to assess how changes in sea ice impact Emperor penguins and Adelie penguins. Holland has been a contributing author on the third, fourth, and fifth assessment reports from the Intergovernmental Panel on Climate Change. In 2020 Holland was named an elected fellow of the American Geophysical Union who cited her "for sustained contributions in polar research and climate modeling". Holland was awarded a MacArthur Fellowship (aka “genius” grant) in September 2026.

=== Selected publications ===
- Holland, M. M.; Bitz, C. M. (September 1, 2003). "Polar amplification of climate change in coupled models". Climate Dynamics. 21 (3–4): 221–232. Bibcode:2003ClDy...21..221H. doi:10.1007/s00382-003-0332-6. ISSN 0930-7575. S2CID 17003665.
- Holland, Marika M.; Bitz, Cecilia M.; Tremblay, Bruno (December 12, 2006). "Future abrupt reductions in the summer Arctic sea ice". Geophysical Research Letters. 33 (23): L23503. Bibcode:2006GeoRL..3323503H. doi:10.1029/2006GL028024. ISSN 0094-8276. S2CID 14187034.
- Stroeve, Julienne; Holland, Marika M.; Meier, Walt; Scambos, Ted; Serreze, Mark (2007). "Arctic sea ice decline: Faster than forecast". Geophysical Research Letters. 34 (9). Bibcode:2007GeoRL..34.9501S. doi:10.1029/2007GL029703. ISSN 1944-8007.
- Holland, Marika M.; Bailey, David A.; Vavrus, Steve (2011). "Inherent sea ice predictability in the rapidly changing Arctic environment of the Community Climate System Model, version 3". Climate Dynamics. 36 (7–8): 1239–1253. Bibcode:2011ClDy...36.1239H. doi:10.1007/s00382-010-0792-4. ISSN 0930-7575.

== Awards and honors ==
- Kavli Frontiers of Science Fellow, National Academy of Sciences (2002, 2006)
- CESM Distinguished Achievement Award (2014)
- Fellow, American Geophysical Union (2020)
- IASC medal, International Arctic Science Committee (2019)
- Fellow, American Meteorological Society (2021)
- MacArthur Foundation Fellowship (2026)
