= International Arctic Science Committee =

International scientific organization

- Abbreviation: IASC
- Formation: 1990; 36 years ago
- Type: INGO
- Purpose: To encourage and facilitate cooperation in all aspects of Arctic research, in all countries engaged in Arctic research and in all areas of the Arctic region
- Location: Akureyri, Iceland
- Members: 25 Countries
- Official language: English
- President: Matthew Druckenmiller
- Affiliations: Arctic Council (Observer), International Science Council (ISC)(affiliate)
- Website: www.iasc.info

The International Arctic Science Committee (IASC) is a non-governmental, international scientific organization. IASC was founded in 1990 by representatives of national scientific organizations of the eight Arctic countries – Canada, Denmark, Finland, Iceland, Norway, Russia (at that time Union of Soviet Socialist Republics), Sweden and the United States. The Founding Articles of IASC were signed in Resolute Bay, Canada.

Over the years, IASC has evolved into the leading international science organisation of the North and its membership today includes 25 countries involved in all aspects of Arctic research, including 17 non-Arctic countries (Austria, Belgium, China, the Czech Republic, France, Germany, India, Italy, Japan, the Netherlands, Poland, Portugal, South Korea, Spain, Switzerland, Turkey and the United Kingdom).

== Mission ==
The Founding Articles committed IASC to pursue a mission of encouraging and facilitating cooperation in all aspects of Arctic research, in all countries engaged in Arctic research and in all areas of the Arctic region. Overall, IASC promotes and supports leading-edge interdisciplinary research in order to foster a greater scientific understanding of the Arctic region and its role in the Earth system.

Rather than defining human and environmental boundaries, IASC tries to bridge those boundaries. IASC is also committed to recognizing that Traditional Knowledge, Indigenous Knowledge, and “Western” scientific knowledge are coequal and complementary knowledge systems, all of which can and should inform the work of IASC.

To achieve this mission IASC:

- Initiates, coordinates and promotes scientific activities at a circumarctic or international level;
- Provides mechanisms and instruments to support science development;
- Provides objective and independent scientific advice on issues of science in the Arctic and communicates scientific information to the public;
- Seeks to ensure that scientific data and information from the Arctic are safeguarded, freely exchangeable and accessible;
- Promotes international access to all geographic areas and the sharing of knowledge, logistics and other resources;
- Provides for the freedom and ethical conduct of science;
- Promotes and involves the next generation of scientists working in the Arctic; and
- Promotes polar cooperation through interaction with relevant science organizations.

== Organization ==
IASC is governed by a Council, composed of one representative of each of its member countries, which meets annually at the Arctic Science Summit Week. The Council sets priorities and guides the work of the organisation. An Executive Committee, consisting of an elected President, four elected Vice-Presidents and a permanent Executive Secretary operates as a Board of Directors and manages IASC activities between Council meetings. The Secretariat is currently hosted by Rannis (Iceland), and is responsible for the day-to-day operations of the organisation. The Secretariat was previously hosted by Germany, Norway and Sweden.

IASC is engaged in all fields of Arctic research and its main scientific working bodies are five Working Groups: Atmosphere, Cryosphere, Marine, Social & Human and Terrestrial. Each Working Group is composed of up to two scientists from each IASC member country, appointed by the national adhering bodies. Though the Working Groups are disciplinary, they also address cross-cutting science questions by initiating activities which involve at least two WGs.

Action Groups are short-term expert groups that provide strategic advice to the IASC Council concerning both long-term activities and urgent needs.

IASC's instruments to support science development include workshops, long-term programs, assessments and science planning activities.

=== IASC Council ===
Representatives of national scientific organizations from all IASC member countries form the IASC Council that meets once a year during the Arctic Science Summit Week.

The Council is the policy and decision-making body for IASC. The members ensure an input of a wide range of scientific and technical knowledge and provide access to a large number of scientists and administrators through their national committees.

Country	Organization	Representative
Austria	Austrian Polar Research Institute	Wolfgang Schöner
Belgium	Belgian National Committee on Antarctic Research (BNCAR)	Philippe Huybrechts
Canada	Canadian Polar Commission	David Hik
China	Chinese Arctic and Antarctic Administration	Tijun Zhang
Czech Republic	Centre for Polar Ecology	Josef Elster
Denmark	Danish Agency for Higher Education and Science	Lise Lotte Sørensen
Finland	Delegation of the Finnish Academies of Science and Letters	Paula Kankaanpä
France	National Center for Scientific Research - CNRS	Jérôme Fort
Germany	German Research Foundation	Günther Heinemann
Iceland	RANNÍS, The Icelandic Centre for Research	Egill Þór Níelsson
India	National Centre for Polar and Ocean Research (NCPOR)	Thamban Meloth
Italy	National Research Council of Italy	Carlo Barbante
Japan	Science Council of Japan, National Institute of Polar Research	Hiroyuki Enomoto, Vice-President
Netherlands	Netherlands Organisation for Scientific Research	Daan Blok
Norway	The Research Council of Norway	Jon L. Fuglestad
Poland	Polish Academy of Sciences, Committee on Polar Research	Monika Kędra, Vice-President
Portugal	Ministério da Educação e Ciência	João Canario, Vice-President
Russia	The Russian Academy of Sciences	Stepan Nikolaevich Kalmykov
South Korea	Korea Polar Research Institute	Hyoung Chul Shin
Spain	Spanish Polar Committee	Antonio Quesada
Sweden	The Swedish Research Council	Sara Moa
Switzerland	Swiss Commission for Polar and High Altitude Research	Gabriela Schaepman-Strub, Vice-President
Turkey	TÜBİTAK Marmara Research Center Polar Research Institute	Burcu Özsoy
United Kingdom	Natural Environment Research Council	Henry Burgess
United States	Polar Research Board	Matthew Druckenmiller, President

=== IASC Working Groups (WGs) ===
IASC carries out much of its scientific coordination through a number of international Working Groups composed of researchers and experts from member countries and partner organizations. The Working Groups promote interdisciplinary collaboration, develop scientific networks, organize workshops and conferences, support early career researchers and contribute to international Arctic research initiatives and assessments.

The Working Groups cooperate across disciplines and frequently contribute to international initiatives such as the Arctic Science Summit Week (ASSW), the International Conference on Arctic Research Planning (ICARP), the Sustaining Arctic Observing Networks (SAON) process and preparations for future International Polar Years.

In the 2020s, IASC increasingly emphasized transdisciplinary and co-produced research approaches within its Working Groups, including stronger integration of Indigenous Knowledge systems and collaboration with Arctic communities and international partner organizations.

The Working Groups also support capacity-building activities, including fellowships, mentoring programs, workshops and networking opportunities for early career researchers.

As of the 2020s, IASC operates five permanent Working Groups covering major areas of Arctic research:

Working Group	Focus areas
Atmosphere Working Group	Arctic weather and climate processes, atmospheric chemistry, air pollution, climate modelling and interactions between the Arctic atmosphere and global climate systems.
Cryosphere Working Group	Research on glaciers, sea ice, snow, permafrost, ice sheets and frozen ground systems, including the role of the cryosphere in global climate change.
Marine Working Group	Arctic Ocean systems, marine ecosystems, sea ice-ocean interactions, biodiversity, fisheries and changing marine environments.
Social and Human Working Group	Human dimensions of Arctic change, including Indigenous perspectives, health, well-being, governance, livelihoods, education, adaptation and community-based research.
Terrestrial Working Group	Arctic land ecosystems, vegetation, soils, wildlife, hydrology and environmental change in terrestrial Arctic environments.

=== IASC Action Groups ===
Actions Groups are established by the IASC Council to provide strategic advice concerning both long-term activities and urgent needs. They are expert groups typically with a one or two year mandate and conclude their task with a report to the Council.

Latest IASC Action Groups:

==== Strategic Plan Action Group (2022–2023) ====
The current IASC Strategic Plan was developed as directed by the IASC Council based upon the key priorities and overarching messages of the 3rd International Conference on Arctic Research Planning (ICARP III). This, IASC's first Strategic Plan, was approved by the IASC Council in June 2018 in Davos Switzerland and is valid from 2018 until 2023. It is based on three scientific ‘pillars’ that provide direction for a necessary progression from knowledge production to exchange, to action.

IASC must develop a new Strategic plan for 2024 onwards. However, in 2025, the 4th International Conference on Arctic Research Planning (ICARP IV) will be held, and its outcomes will influence IASC strategic planning in the future. The IASC Council therefore decided to extend the existing Strategic Plan through 2025 with only an internal update of the existing text during 2022 / 2023. An Action Group has been formed to lead the internal update of the existing IASC Strategic Plan during 2022 / 2023

==== Action Group on Carbon Footprint (2020–2022) ====
Acknowledging the link between anthropogenic carbon emissions and rapid changes in the Arctic, including the Arctic amplification of climate change, IASC has recently convened an Action Group on Carbon Footprint (AGCF). The remit of the AGCF is to facilitate a full organisational response to the climate crisis and to explore ways to minimise the carbon footprint of IASC-related activities themselves. As an organisation promoting research and transnational access in the Arctic, we have a duty to mitigate the impacts of our activities, as well as to lead the way. The group started its work in early 2021.

==== Action Group on Indigenous Involvement (2017–2020) ====
In light of the commitments made through the ICARP process and strategic planning, IASC is moving forward with these goals of better involving Indigenous peoples and incorporating Indigenous/traditional knowledge. Establishing an Action Group on Indigenous Involvement should lead to concrete recommendations to the IASC Council that will help IASC achieve its goals. The AGII report was greatefully received and approved by the IASC Council in March 2020. IASC will proceed with consideration and implementation of the AGII recommendations.

=== IASC Standing Committees ===
Standing Committees are long-term bodies created by Council for long-term IASC initiatives working on defined long-term strategic issues that are of relevance and importance for all IASC activities and the organisation as a whole. They assist IASC in the implementation of IASC's mission. The Standing Committee may also work on own projects and activities within its mandate

==== Standing Committee on Indigenous Involvement (SCII) ====
The scope and responsibilities of the Standing Committee on Indigenous Involvement (SCII) is:

- Provide advice and guidance for the IASC Executive Committee and Council regarding Indigenous Peoples meaningful involvement in IASC activities during the planning and implementation of IASC strategic planning (e.g. ICARP processes).
- Ensure interaction and explore opportunities with the IASC Working Groups on a positive mutual basis to develop joint projects and to promote meaningful Indigenous involvement and leadership in IASC WG projects and activities.
- Build on the recommendations of the past AGII by developing concepts and proposals for the implementation of the recommendations from or in the spirit of the AGII report.
- Evaluate the progress of the implementation of the IASC actions regarding meaningful Indigenous involvement.
- Create opportunities for interaction with relevant international, regional and national Arctic Indigenous organizations;
- Initiate listening sessions, talking circles, workshops, conferences and educational events

== Arctic Science Summit Week (ASSW) ==
The Arctic Science Summit Week (ASSW) is organised annually by the International Arctic Science Committee (IASC) to provide opportunities for coordination, cooperation and collaboration between the various scientific organisations involved in Arctic research. It was initiated by the IASC in 1999 and has evolved into the most important annual gathering of the Arctic research organisation.

In odd number years, the ASSW also includes a Science Symposium. These symposia create a platform for exchanging knowledge, cross fertilisation and collaboration and attract scientists, students, policy makers and other professionals from all over the world.

In even number years the ASSW includes the Arctic Observing Summit (AOS), a high-level, biennial summit that aims to provide community-driven, science-based guidance for the design, implementation, coordination and long-term operation of Arctic observing systems.

== Fourth International Conference on Arctic Research Planning (ICARP IV) ==
In the lead-up to IASC's 35th anniversary in 2025, the International Arctic Science Committee coordinated the Fourth International Conference on Arctic Research Planning (ICARP IV), a multi-year planning process running from 2022 to 2026. The process engaged Arctic researchers, Indigenous Peoples, policy-makers, Arctic residents and other stakeholders to identify priority knowledge gaps and research needs for the coming decade, and to explore ways of addressing them.

The ICARP IV Summit was held in Boulder, Colorado, United States, during Arctic Science Summit Week 2025. It served as the main community consultation milestone of the process and contributed to planning for the Fifth International Polar Year in 2032–2033.

ICARP IV was organised around seven Research Priority Teams, addressing themes including the Arctic in the global Earth system, future climate dynamics and ecosystem responses, social-ecological systems, Arctic research cooperation and diplomacy, co-production and Indigenous-led research, education and capacity sharing, and research infrastructure, logistics and services.

The final outcomes of ICARP IV were released during the Arctic Science Summit Week 2026 in Aarhus, Denmark, on 26 March 2026. These included the ICARP IV Final Outcomes Report and seven Research Priority Team final reports. The reports set out research priorities for the next decade and are intended to inform preparations for the Fifth International Polar Year.

== Fifth International Polar Year (2032–2033) ==
IASC is one of the international organizations involved in planning the Fifth International Polar Year (IPY-5), scheduled for 2032–2033. The initiative is intended as a large-scale, coordinated international effort to advance polar research and address urgent global challenges connected to environmental and societal change in the Arctic and Antarctic.

Planning discussions for IPY-5 have been underway since 2021. An initial IPY-5 Concept Note and planning timeline were published in October 2023, and the official IPY-5 website was launched in October 2024.

The planning process is jointly supported by IASC, the Scientific Committee on Antarctic Research (SCAR), the World Meteorological Organization (WMO), the International Science Council (ISC), and other international partners representing both polar regions.

IPY-5 is organized through an international Planning Group and an Executive Committee, supported by an interim Secretariat operated by the IASC and SCAR Secretariats. The Planning Group includes representatives of international organizations and meets regularly to provide direction for the planning process. Task Groups address specific aspects of IPY-5 planning, including scientific vision and priorities, country and funder involvement, Indigenous leadership and involvement, capacity building and early career coordination, and data coordination.

The IPY-5 timeline includes a planning phase from 2021 to 2025, a project phase from 2026 to 2033, and a legacy phase from 2034 to 2037. The intensive observation and research period is planned for 2032–2033.

The outcomes of the ICARP IV process are expected to contribute to the development of Arctic research priorities and implementation pathways relevant to IPY-5.

== IASC Fellowship Program ==
The IASC Fellowship Program was established in 2014 and is meant to engage early career researchers in the work of the IASC Working Groups (WGs): Atmosphere, Cryosphere, Marine, Social & Human, and Terrestrial. Each fall, a call for fellowships is released, and at least one Fellow per WG is selected. In recent years, the number of fellowships has expanded to include dedicated Indigenous Fellowships and partnerships with organizations such as the Prince Albert II of Monaco Foundation.

IASC Fellows are doctoral or postdoctoral researchers who actively participate in selected activities of the IASC WGs. Fellows are expected to contribute scientifically and also to help organize specific activities and to coordinate the reporting to the IASC Secretariat.

The total duration of the IASC Fellowship Program is 1+2 years. In their first year, selected Fellows will receive travel support to attend two consecutive Arctic Science Summit Weeks (ASSWs) where the annual WG meetings are held. After the first year, Fellows have the opportunity to stay involved for up to 2 more years without dedicated funding support from IASC.

In 2023, IASC established an alumni network for former fellows.

== IASC Medal ==
The medals are awarded "in recognition of exceptional and sustained contributions to understanding of the Arctic". The first medal was awarded in 2010.

Year	Recipient	Citation
2010	Patrick Webber	"Medal for Arctic Science and Inspiring Mentorship"
2011	Martin Jakobsson	"A New Generation of Scientists"
2012	Igor Krupnik	"Bridging Natural and Social Sciences"
2013	Leif G. Anderson	"Understanding the Arctic Ocean"
2014	Julian Dowdeswell	"Understanding of Glacier Dynamics and Ocean-Ice Sheet Interactions"
2015	Odd Rogne	"IASC Award for Service"
2015	Jacqueline Grebmeier	"Exceptional Contributions to the Understanding of the Arctic"
2016	John E. Walsh	"Exceptional Contributions to Modeling and Evaluating Climate Change Impacts in the Arctic"
2017	Terry Callaghan	"Outstanding Contributions to International Arctic Science Collaboration"
2018	Oran Young	"Outstanding Achievement in Understanding Arctic Institutional Dynamics, International Regimes, and Environmental Policy"
2019	Marika Holland	"Outstanding Achievement and Scientific Leadership role in Understanding, Modeling and Predicting the Arctic Climate System, in particular Sea Ice"
2020	Sue Moore	"Outstanding Achievement in Understanding Marine Mammals as Ecosystem Sentinels and how Climate Change is Influencing the Phenology of Arctic Species"
2021	Atsumu Ohmura	"Outstanding achievements in understanding complex climate and glacier relationships, global energy budgets, and thermal energy flow in the Arctic; and for excellence in program building, international collaborations, and mentorship in the cryospheric sciences"
2022	Dalee Sambo Dorough	" Outstanding achievements in advocacy for the rights of Indigenous peoples, her service to a wide range of arctic communities, including the Arctic Council, and her influence as a legal scholar."
2023	Paul Friedrich Wassmann	"Outstanding long-lasting achievements to improve the knowledge of the ecology of the Arctic Ocean and the ability to combine excellent science and holistic drive to bring together various disciplines"
2024	James Overland	"Outstanding long-lasting achievements to improve interdisciplinary knowledge, particularly on the linkages between changes in the Arctic and the weather in mid-latitudes, as well as ensuring this information becomes widely available through his ability to present complex information in an accessible way and his critical role in the formation of the IASC Atmosphere Working Group."

Information on the IASC Medal recipients from the IASC website unless otherwise noted.

== See also ==
- Arctic Climate Impact Assessment
- Arctic Council
- Arctic Cooperation and Politics
- International Polar Year
