= Wired Science =

US television program

- Opening title screen
- Directed by: Steve Hirsen
- Starring: Brian Unger; Aomawa Shields; Chris Hardwick; Kamala Lopez; Ziya Tong; Adam Rogers
- Country of origin: United States
- Original language: English
- No. of seasons: 1
- No. of episodes: 11

Production
- Executive producers: Tod Mesirow; David Axlerod; Melanie Cornwell; Karen Robinson Hunte; Jackie Kain
- Producer: KCET
- Running time: 55 minutes

Original release
- Network: PBS
- Release: January 3, October 3, 2007 – December 26, 2007

Wired Science was a weekly television program that covered modern scientific and technological topics. In January 2007 PBS aired pilot episodes for three different science programs, including Wired Science. Using Nielsen ratings, CPB-sponsored research and public feedback, PBS selected Wired Science for a 10-episode run in the fall schedule. The program was a production of KCET Los Angeles. In July 2008, the show was officially cancelled.
