= Terry Callaghan =

British biologist

Terry Callaghan CMG
- Born: Terence Vincent Callaghan; 11 March 1945 (age 81); Stockport
- Education: Burnage Grammar School; University of Manchester (BSc); University of Birmingham (PhD)
- Known for: Arctic ecology
- Awards: Zayed International Prize for the Environment (2007)
- Scientific career
- Fields: Ecology
- Workplaces: University of Sheffield; Tomsk State University
- Thesis: Ecophysiological and taxonic studies on bi-polar Phleum alpinum L. (1972)
- Website: www.sheffield.ac.uk/biosciences/people/academic-staff/terry-v-callaghan

Terence Vincent Callaghan CMG (born 1945) is a British biologist specialised in the ecology of the Arctic. Much of his work on arctic plants has taken place in Abisko in northernmost Sweden, based at the Abisko Scientific Research Station where he served as director. He was a lead author of the IPCC Fourth Assessment Reports chapter on polar regions.

== Education and early life ==
Callaghan was born in Stockport and grew up in Levenshulme in Manchester and was educated at Burnage Grammar School. He was awarded a Bachelor of Science degree from the University of Manchester in 1967 and a PhD from the University of Birmingham in 1972 for ecophysiological and taxonic studies on Phleum alpinum.

== Career and research ==
Callaghan's research has focussed on the arctic and subarctic environment and the ecology of plants, animals, and ecosystem processes, including ecological responses to climate change, atmospheric carbon dioxide concentrations and UV-B radiation. He has held academic positions at the Institute of Terrestrial Ecology, the University of Sheffield, the University of Manchester, the University of York and Tomsk State University.

=== Awards and honours ===
Callaghan was awarded the Zayed International Prize for the Environment in 2007, the Vega Medal by the Swedish Society for Anthropology and Geography in 2011, the International Arctic Science Committee medal in 2017. He was appointed Companion of the Order of St Michael and St George (CMG) in the 2018 New Year Honours for services to advancing knowledge and international collaboration in Arctic science.
