= Detecting Earth from distant star-based systems =

Detecting Earth as an exoplanet

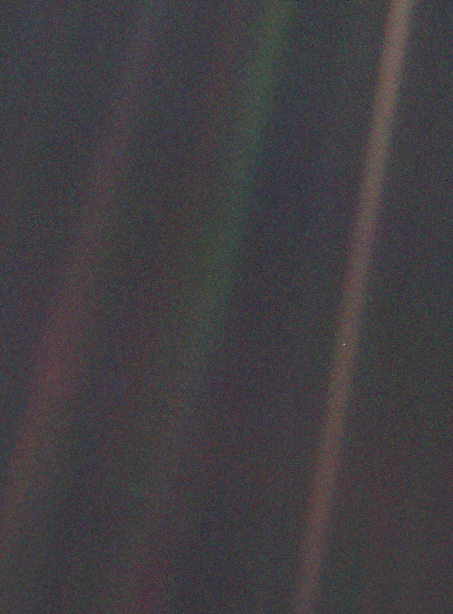
Pale Blue Dot, a photograph of Earth taken on February 14, 1990, by the Voyager 1 space probe from a distance of approximately 6 billion kilometers (3.7 billion miles, 40.5 AU). Earth is seen as a tiny dot within deep space: the blueish-white speck almost halfway up the rightmost band of light.

There are several methods currently used by astronomers to detect distant exoplanets from Earth. Theoretically, some of these methods can be used to detect Earth as an exoplanet from distant star systems.

== History ==
Star dims due to transiting exoplanet

In June 2021, astronomers identified 1,715 stars (with likely related exoplanetary systems) within 326 light-years (100 parsecs) that have a favorable positional vantage point – in relation to the Earth Transit Zone (ETZ) – of detecting Earth as an exoplanet transiting the Sun since the beginnings of human civilization (about 5,000 years ago); an additional 319 stars are expected to arrive at this special vantage point in the next 5,000 years. Seven known exoplanet hosts, including Ross 128, may be among these stars. Teegarden's Star and TRAPPIST-1 may be expected to see the Earth in 29 and 1,642 years, respectively. Radio waves, emitted by humans, have reached over 75 of the closest stars that were studied. In June 2021, astronomers reported identifying 29 planets in habitable zones that may be capable of observing the Earth. Earlier, in October 2020, astronomers had initially identified 508 such stars within 326 light-years (100 parsecs) that would have a favorable positional vantage point – in relation to the Earth Transit Zone (ETZ) – of detecting Earth as an exoplanet transiting the Sun.

Transit method is the most popular tool used to detect exoplanets and the most common tool to spectroscopically analyze exoplanetary atmospheres. As a result, such studies, based on the transit method, will be useful in the search for life on exoplanets beyond the Solar System by the SETI program, Breakthrough Listen Initiative, as well as upcoming exoplanetary TESS mission searches.

Detectability of Earth from distant star-based systems may allow for the detectability of humanity and/or analysis of Earth from distant vantage points such as via "atmospheric SETI" for the detection of atmospheric compositions explainable only by use of (artificial) technology like air pollution containing nitrogen dioxide from e.g. transportation technologies. The easiest or most likely artificial signals from Earth to be detectable are brief pulses transmitted by anti-ballistic missile (ABM) early-warning and space-surveillance radars during the Cold War and later astronomical and military radars. Unlike the earliest and conventional radio- and television-broadcasting which has been claimed to be undetectable at short distances, such signals could be detected from very distant, possibly star-based, receiver stations – any single of which would detect brief episodes of powerful pulses repeating with intervals of one Earth day – and could be used to detect both Earth as well as the presence of a radar-utilizing civilization on it.

Studies have suggested that radio broadcast leakage – with the program material likely not being detectable – may be a technosignature detectable at distances of up to a hundred light years with technology equivalent to the Square Kilometer Array if the location of Earth is known. Likewise, if Earth's location can be and is known, it may be possible to use atmospheric analysis to detect life or favorable conditions for it on Earth via biosignatures, including MERMOZ instruments that may be capable of remotely detecting living matter on Earth.

== Experiments ==
In 1980s, astronomer Carl Sagan persuaded NASA to perform an experiment of detecting life and civilization on Earth using instruments of the Galileo spacecraft. It was launched in December 1990, and when it was 960 km (600 mi) from the planet's surface, Galileo turned its instruments to observe Earth. Sagan's paper was titled "A search for life on Earth from the Galileo spacecraft"; he wrote that "high-resolution images of Australia and Antarctica obtained as Galileo flew overhead did not yield signs of civilization"; other measurements showed the presence of vegetation and detected radio transmissions.

== See also ==
- Earliest known life forms
- Exoplanetology
- List of exoplanet search projects
- Lists of exoplanets
- MERMOZ
- Methods of detecting exoplanets
- Nexus for Exoplanet System Science – Dedicated to the search for life on exoplanets
- Planetary science – Science of planets and planetary systems
- Quiet and loud aliens – Concept in astrobiology
