= Cecilia Bitz =

American climatologist

Cecilia M. Bitz
- Born: March 4, 1966 (age 60)
- Education: Oregon State University (BA) University of Washington (MA) University of Washington (PhD)
- Occupation: Professor at the University of Washington
- Awards: American Geophysical Union Fellow American Meteorological Society Fellow Rosenstiel Award in Atmospheric Science and Oceanography

Cecilia M. Bitz is an American climatologist known for her research on sea ice and high-latitude climate change. She is a professor and chair in the Atmospheric Sciences Department, as well as the director of the Program on Climate Change at the University of Washington. She was featured on NPR's All Things Considered segment to speak about factors that lead to sea ice loss in 2007, and testified before the United States Senate committee of Energy and Natural Resources on arctic opportunities in 2015.

== Early life and education ==
Cecilia Bitz was born in Portland, Oregon on March 4, 1966. While she initially had an interest in physics, she discovered her passion for sea ice after reading a book on climate change, "Our Changing Atmosphere," by John Firor. In 1988, she received her bachelor's degree in engineering physics from Oregon State University, and her master's degree in Physics from the University of Washington in 1990. She completed her doctoral work in atmospheric sciences at the University of Washington in 1997, where she worked with David S. Battisti to complete her dissertation on Natural Variability in the Arctic Climate using climate models.

== Career and research ==
Since receiving her PhD, Cecilia Bitz has conducted research on sea ice mostly through climate modeling and has contributed to over 100 refereed publications. She began teaching at the University of Washington in 2005, where she still teaches in the Atmospheric Sciences Department today.

In 2013–14, she was a Fulbright Senior Scholar to New Zealand. In 2006, she co-published research that predicted abrupt and massive ice loss in the Arctic in the summer of 2007. She has introduced new methods for modeling sea ice as well as explained why Arctic sea ice thins rapidly with greenhouse warming. She currently co-leads the Sea Ice Prediction Network, which forecasts Arctic sea ice for shipping, military, and Arctic indigenous peoples.

== Awards and honors ==
- American Geophysical Union Fellow - 2018
- American Meteorological Society Fellow - 2015
- American Geophysical Union Ascent Award in Atmospheric Science - 2013
- Fulbright Scholar Award to New Zealand - 2013
- Rosenstiel Award in Atmospheric Science and Oceanography - 2013

== Publications ==
Cecilia Bitz has contributed to over 100 refereed publications. Some of her most influential works include:

- Holland, Marika M.; Bitz, Cecilia M.; Tremblay, Bruno (2006-12-12). "Future abrupt reductions in the summer Arctic sea ice". Geophysical Research Letters. 33 (23): L23503. Bibcode:2006GeoRL..3323503H. doi:10.1029/2006gl028024. ISSN 0094-8276. S2CID 14187034.
- Bitz, C. M.; Gent, P. R.; Woodgate, R. A.; Holland, M. M.; Lindsay, R. (2006). "The Influence of Sea Ice on Ocean Heat Uptake in Response to Increasing CO2". Journal of Climate. 19 (11): 2437–2450. Bibcode:2006JCli...19.2437B. doi:10.1175/jcli3756.1. ISSN 0894-8755. S2CID 15251569.
- Bitz, C. M.; Roe, G. H. (2004). "A Mechanism for the High Rate of Sea-Ice Thinning in the Arctic Ocean". Journal of Climate. 17 (18): 3622–3631. Bibcode:2004JCli...17.3623B. doi:10.1175/1520-0442(2004)017<3623:amfthr>2.0.co;2. S2CID 1980186.
- Holland, M. M.; Bitz, C. M. (2003-09-01). "Polar amplification of climate change in coupled models". Climate Dynamics. 21 (3–4): 221–232. Bibcode:2003ClDy...21..221H. doi:10.1007/s00382-003-0332-6. ISSN 0930-7575. S2CID 17003665.
- Collins, William D.; Bitz, Cecilia M.; Blackmon, Maurice L.; Bonan, Gordon B.; Bretherton, Christopher S.; Carton, James A.; Chang, Ping; Doney, Scott C.; Hack, James J. (2006). "The Community Climate System Model Version 3 (CCSM3)". Journal of Climate. 19 (11): 2122–2143. Bibcode:2006JCli...19.2122C. doi:10.1175/jcli3761.1. hdl:1912/4176. S2CID 15157242.
