= Pete Worden =

American aerospace engineer, astronomer, air officer and philanthropic executive

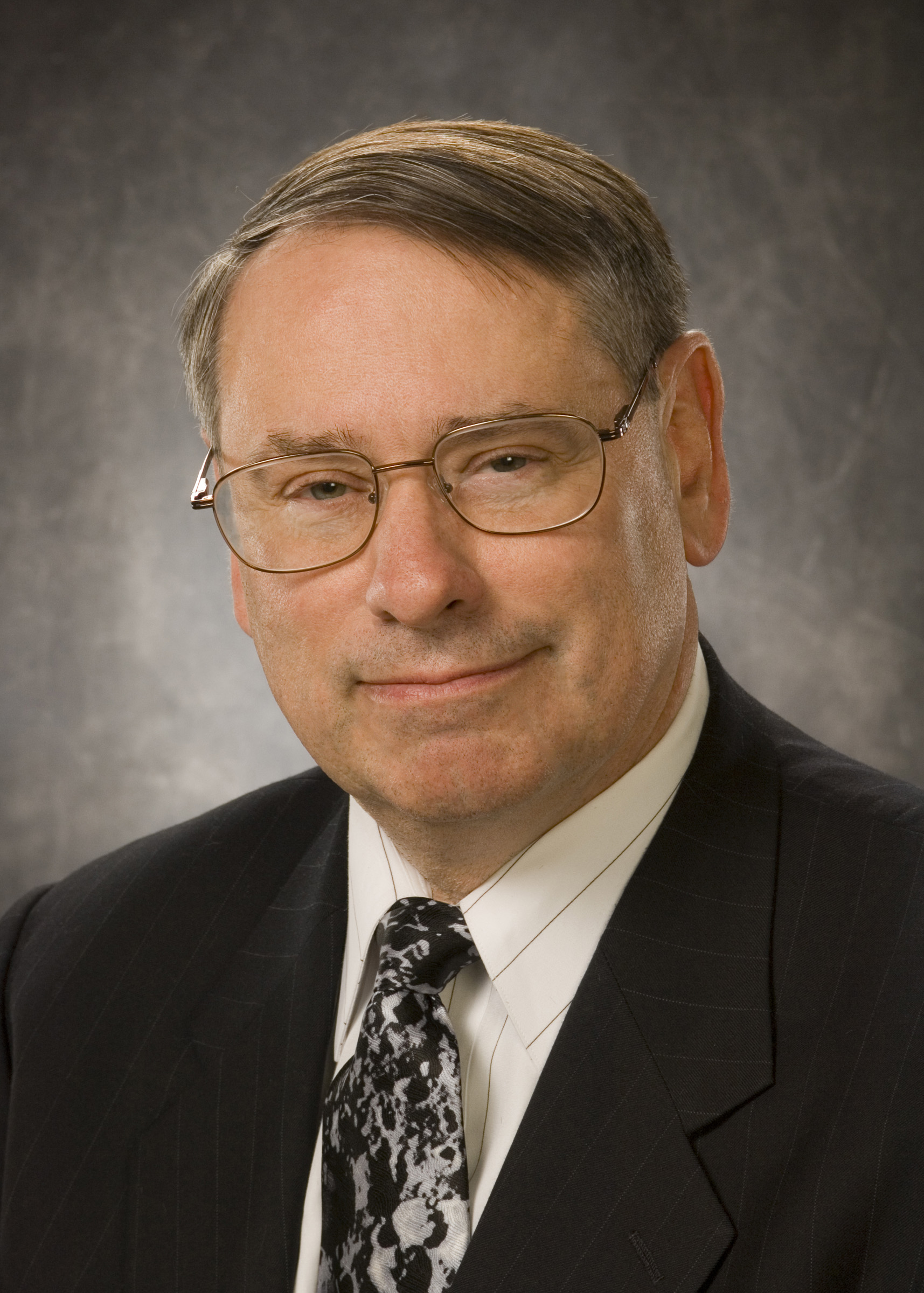
- Pete Worden, official photo portrait as NASA Ames Research Center director
- Born: October 21, 1949 (age 76); Michigan
- Education: University of Michigan; University of Arizona
- Known for: Chairman of the Breakthrough Prize Foundation / former director of NASA Ames Research Center
- Scientific career
- Fields: Astrophysicist, U.S. Air Force General
- Thesis: Solar Supergranulation (1975)

Simon Peter Worden (born 1949, in Michigan) is formerly the director of NASA's Ames Research Center (ARC) at Moffett Field, California, until his retirement on March 31, 2015. Prior to joining NASA, he held several positions in the United States Air Force and was research professor of astronomy at the University of Arizona, Tucson. He is a recognized expert on space issues – both civil and military. Worden has authored or co-authored more than 150 scientific papers in astrophysics, space sciences, and strategic studies. He served as a scientific co-investigator for two NASA space science missions, and received the NASA Outstanding Leadership Medal for the 1994 Clementine mission. He was named the 2009 Federal Laboratory Consortium Laboratory Director of the Year.

Worden announced his planned resignation from NASA in February 2015, indicating he would be pursuing "some long-held dreams in the private sector".

On July 20, 2015 at the Royal Society in London, Yuri Milner and Stephen Hawking launched the Breakthrough Initiatives. At the press conference Pete Worden was introduced as the chairman for the Breakthrough Prize Foundation. In this new role, Worden is tasked to run the Breakthrough Initiatives.

== Background ==
Prior to becoming Director of NASA Ames, Worden was a research professor of astronomy, optical sciences and planetary sciences at the University of Arizona where his primary research direction was the development of large space optics for national security and scientific purposes and near-earth asteroids. He also worked on topics related to space exploration and solar-type activity in nearby stars.

In addition to his position with the University of Arizona, Worden served as a consultant to the Defense Advanced Research Projects Agency (DARPA) on space-related issues. During the 2004 Congressional Session he worked as a Congressional Fellow with the Office of Senator Sam Brownback (R-KS), where he served as Senator Brownback's chief advisor on NASA and space issues.

Worden retired from the United States Air Force in 2004 after 29 years of active service. His final position there was director of development and transformation, Space and Missile Systems Center, Air Force Space Command, Los Angeles Air Force Base, CA. In this position he was responsible for developing new directions for Air Force Space Command programs and was instrumental in initiating a major Responsive Space Program designed to produce space systems and launchers capable of tailored military effects on timescales of hours.

Worden was commissioned in 1971 after receiving a Bachelor of Science degree from the University of Michigan. He entered the Air Force in 1975 after graduating from the University of Arizona with a doctorate in astronomy. Throughout the 1980s and early 1990s, Worden served in every phase of development, international negotiations and implementation of the Strategic Defense Initiative. He twice served in the Executive Office of the President. As the staff officer for initiatives in the George Bush administration's National Space Council, Worden spearheaded efforts to revitalize U.S. civil space exploration and earth monitoring programs.

Worden commanded the 50th Space Wing that is responsible for more than 60 Department of Defense satellites and more than 6,000 people at 23 worldwide locations. He then served as deputy director for requirements at Headquarters Air Force Space Command, as well as the deputy director for command and control with the office of the deputy chief of staff for air and space operations at Air Force headquarters. Prior to assuming his current position, Worden was responsible for policy and direction of five mission areas: force enhancement, space support, space control, force application and computer network defense.

== Innovations ==
Worden was a key early innovator and proponent in the area of small satellites. While at BMDO and its predecessor SDIO he played major roles in development of the DC-X and the Clementine mission. Clementine was a relatively small, low-cost, and rapidly developed satellite ostensibly developed to test sensor and propulsion technology for missile interceptors. Clementine mapped the Moon and travelled on towards the near-Earth asteroid 1620 Geographos (though it did not achieve that final goal). Worden also instituted and championed innovative management and engineering techniques while at BMDO, including rapid prototyping, "build a little test a little", a "badgeless" work environment, and a flat organizational structure.

More recently, after becoming NASA Ames Research Center director, he actively developed Ames' capability for rapid prototyping of small spacecraft. He also "engineered" innovative agreements between NASA Ames and a variety of private sector and public sector partners. Recognizing the critical importance of revitalizing NASA (and the whole U.S. aerospace sector), he consistently and actively recruited and empowered younger workers, as well as workers from other agencies and other countries.

== International Space University ==
Worden is actively involved in the International Space University (ISU), where, as of 2009, he was a guest teacher in the ISU Space Studies Program (SSP), formerly Summer Session Program. His support led to the selection of NASA Ames as the host for the 2009 ISU SSP program in the months July and August 2009.

== Support for NEO missions ==
Pete Worden has long been a proponent of robotic and, more recently, crewed space missions to near-Earth objects. This class of mission is thought by a growing number of space enthusiasts and professionals to have scientific, technological, political and sociological merit as an alternate to the lunar component of the vision for space exploration.

== NASA criticism ==
Pete Worden was sighted herding goats near the airfield at NASA Ames around the time of Yuri's Night 2007

While at the Air Force, Worden was one of NASA's most well-known and credible critics. In one (in)famous essay he compared NASA to a "self-licking ice cream cone". Later, after having worked for U.S. Sen Sam Brownback (R-Kan), Worden said his Capitol Hill experience demonstrated to him that NASA actually stood for "Never A Straight Answer."

Worden also has a reputation as being something of a "character." For instance, he supported and presided over "Yuri's Night Bay Area", held at NASA Ames Research Center in 2007. He is also known occasionally to costume, usually dressing as either Darth Vader, a wizard, or after arriving at Ames, as a goat herder. In April 2007, Pete Worden became the first NASA Center director to address an audience at a space conference (ISDC07) through the virtual world of Second Life.

His propensity for costume sparked an inquiry from Senator Chuck Grassley that led to an investigation by the NASA inspector general's office into a private project to photograph a group of Viking re-enactors calling themselves "The Vikings of Bjornstad". Although concluding that no government money had been spent on the Viking re-enactment, the investigation itself was estimated to have cost between $40,000 and $600,000.

== Career timeline ==
=== Job assignments ===
- July 2015 – present, chairman, The Breakthrough Prize Foundation, Breakthrough Initiatives
- May 2006 – March 2015, director, NASA Ames Research Center, Moffett Field, CA.
- April 2005 – April 2006, research professor of planetary sciences and research professor of optical sciences, The University of Arizona, Tucson, AZ.
- March 2004 – April 2005, research professor of astronomy, The University of Arizona, Tucson, Arizona.
- March 2004 – December 2004, Congressional Fellow assigned to the office of Senator Sam Brownback (R-KS) on detail as a research professor of astronomy from the University of Arizona, Washington, DC.
- October 2002 – February 2004, director of development and transformation, Space and Missile Systems Center, Air Force Space Command, Los Angeles AFB, California.
- November 2000 – October 2002, vice director of operations, Headquarters U.S. Space Command, Peterson AFB, Colorado.
- January 2000 – November 2000, deputy director for command and control, deputy chief of staff for air and space operations, Headquarters U.S. Air Force, Washington, D.C.
- September 1998 – December 1999, deputy director for operational requirements, deputy chief of staff for air and space operations, Headquarters U.S. Air Force, Washington, D.C.
- July 1997 – September 1998, deputy for battlespace dominance, Directorate of Operational Requirements, deputy chief of staff for air and space operations, Headquarters U.S. Air Force, Washington, D.C.
- March 1996 – June 1997, deputy director of requirements, Air Force Space Command, Peterson AFB, Colorado.
- November 1994 – March 1996, commander, 50th Space Wing, Air Force Space Command, Falcon AFB, Colorado.
- August 1994 – November 1994, director of analysis and engineering, Space Warfare Center, Air Force Space Command, Falcon AFB, Colorado.
- December 1993 – July 1994, technical adviser to the special assistant for theater air defense, Headquarters U.S. Air Force, Washington, D.C.
- October 1991 – November 1993, deputy for technology, Ballistic Missile Defense Organization, Washington, D.C.
- September 1989 – September 1991, director, advanced concepts, science and technology, National Space Council, Executive Office of the President, Washington, D.C.
- August 1987 – August 1989, crew commander, Space Defense Operations Center, later, chief, Special Operations Branch, U.S. Space Command, Cheyenne Mountain Air Force Base, Colorado.
- June 1986 – July 1987, senior policy analyst, Office of Science and Technology Policy, Executive Office of the President, and senior research fellow, National Defense University, Fort Lesley J. McNair, Washington, D.C.
- October 1983 – May 1986, special assistant to the director, Strategic Defense Initiative Organization, Department of Defense, and adviser, delegation to the negotiations on nuclear and space arms with the Soviet Union, Geneva, Switzerland
- November 1979 – September 1983, chief, Advanced Technology Division, Air Force Space Systems Division, Los Angeles AFB, California.
- May 1975 – October 1979, astrophysicist, Air Force Geophysics Laboratory, National Solar Observatory, Sunspot, New Mexico.

=== Awards and decorations ===
Worden is entitled to the following awards and decorations:

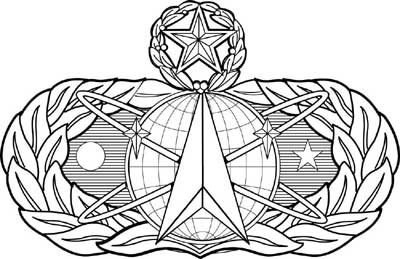
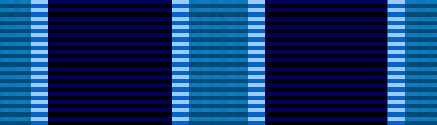
Master Space and Missile Badge
Defense Superior Service Medal with oak leaf cluster
Legion of Merit with oak leaf cluster
Defense Meritorious Service Medal with three oak leaf clusters
Meritorious Service Medal
Joint Meritorious Unit Award
Outstanding Unit Award
Organizational Excellence Award with oak leaf cluster
NASA Outstanding Leadership Medal
Combat Readiness Medal
Air Force Recognition Ribbon
National Defense Service Medal
Air Force Longevity Service Award with one silver oak leaf cluster
Air Force Training Ribbon

=== Commissions ===
Promotions
Insignia	Rank	Date
	Retired from Active Duty	May 1, 2004
	Brigadier general	September 1, 2000
	Colonel	October 1, 1989
	Lieutenant colonel	April 1, 1986
	Major	November 1, 1982
	Captain	May 1, 1977
	First lieutenant	May 1, 1974
	Second lieutenant	May 1, 1971

=== Education ===
- 1997 National Security Studies, Maxwell School of Citizenship and Public Affairs, Syracuse University, Syracuse, N.Y.
- 1987 National War College, Washington, D.C.
- 1978 Squadron Officer School, Maxwell AFB, Ala.
- 1975 Doctor of philosophy degree in astronomy, University of Arizona, Tucson
- 1971 Bachelor of Science degree in physics and astronomy, University of Michigan, Ann Arbor

=== Selected publications ===
1. Tagliaferri, E., Spalding, R., Jacobs, C., Worden, S.P., and Erlich, A., 1994, Hazards due to Comets and Asteroids, Space Science Series, Tucson, AZ: Edited by Tom Gehrels, M.S. Matthews, and A. Schumann, Published by University of Arizona Press, p.199, “Detection of Meteoroid Impacts by Optical Sensors in Earth Orbit.”
2. Worden, Col. S. P., "The Strategic Defense Initiative Organization CLEMENTINE Mission," Proceedings of the Near-Earth-Object Interception Workshop, January 14–16, 1992.
3. Treu, Marvin H., Worden, Simon P., Bedard, Michael G., Bartlett, Randall, K., 1998, Earth, Moon, and Planets, 82/83, 27, “USAF Perspectives on Leonid Threat and Data Gathering Campaigns.”
4. Worden, S.P., 1998, Proceedings of the Marshall Institute (Washington, DC: Marshall Institute), “Why We Need the Airborne Laser.”
5. Brown, P., Campbell, M.D., Ellis, K.J., Hawkes, R.L., Jones, J., Gural, P., Babcock, D., Barnbaum, C., Bartlett, R.K., Bedard, M., Bedient, J., Beech, M., Brosch, N., Clifton, S., Connors, M., Cooke, B., Goetz, P., Gaines, J.K., Gramer, L., Gray, J., Hildebrand, A.R., Jewell, D., Jones, A., Leake, M., LeBlanc, A.G., Looper. J.K., McIntosch, B.A., Montague, T., Morrow, M.J., Murray, I.S., Nikolova, S., Robichaud, J., Sponder, R., Talarico, J., Theismeijer, C., Tilton, B., Treu, M., Vachon, C., Webster, A.R., Weryk, R., Worden, S.P., 1998, Earth, Moon, and Planets, 82/83, 167, “Global Ground-Based Electro-Optical and Radar Observations of the 1999 Leonid Shower: First Results.”
6. LeBlanc, A.G., Murray, I.S., Hawkes, R.L., Worden, P., Campbell, M.D., Brown, P., Jenniskens, P., Correll, R.R., Montague, T., and Babcock, D.D., 2000, Mon. Not. Roy. Ast. Soc., “Evidence for Transverse Spread in Leonid Meteors”
7. Hildebrand, A.R., Carroll, K.A., Balam, D.D., Cardinal, R.D., Matthews, J.M., Kuschnig, R., Walker, G.A.H., Brown, P.G., Tedesco, E.F., Worden, S.P., Burrell, D.A., Chodas, P.W., Larson, S.M., Spahr, T.B., and Wallace, B.J., 2001, 32nd Annual Lunar and Planetary Science Conference, Houston, TX, #1790., “The Near-Earth Space Surveillance (NESS) Mission: Discovery, Tracking, and Characterization of Asteroids, Comets, and Artificial Satellites with a Microsatellite.”
8. Worden, S.P., and France, Martin, E.B., Comparative Strategy, 20, No 1, (October-December 2001), 32, “Towards an Evolving Deterrence Strategy: Space and Information Dominance.”
9. Worden, S.P., 2001, Aerospace Power Journal, Vol XV, No. 1 (Spring 2001): 50-57, “The Air Force and Future Space Directions: Are We Good Stewards?”
10. Worden, S.P., 2002, United States Space Command Press Release, July 15, 2002, “Military Perspectives on the Near-Earth Object (NEO) Threat.”
11. Worden, Simon P., and Shaw, John E., September 2002, Whither Space Power? Forging a Strategy for the New Century (Maxwell AFB, AL: Fairchild Paper)(large file)
12. Hawkes, R.I., Campbell, M.D., LeBlanc, A.G., Parker, L., Brown, P., Jones, J., Worden, S.P., Correll, R.R., Woodworth, S.C., Fisher, A.A., Gural, P., Murray, I.S., Connors, M., Montague, T., Jewell, D., and Babcock, D.D., 2002, Dust in the Solar System and Other Planetary Systems, Proceedings of the IAU Colloquium 181, Edited by S.F. Green, I.P. Williams, J.A.M. McDonnell and N. McBride (Oxford: Pergamum), COSPAR Colloquia series, Vol 15., "The Size of Meteoroid Constituent Grains: Implications for Interstellar Meteoroids."
13. Brown, P., Spaulding, R.E., ReVelle, D.O., Tagliaferri, E., and Worden, S.P., 2002, Nature, 420, 294, “The Flux of Small Near-Earth Objects Colliding with the Earth.”
14. Worden, S.P., 2002, Statement Before the House Science Committee, Space and Aeronautics SubCommittee, U.S. House of Representatives, October 3, 2002, "Near Earth Object Threat."
15. Worden, Simon.P. and Correll, Randall R., 2004, Defense Horizons, number 40, “Responsive Space and Strategic Information,” (Washington, DC: National Defense University)
16. Worden, Simon.P. and Johnson-Freese, Joan, 2004, Joint Forces Quarterly, Number 33, “Globalizing Space Security.”
17. "Deposition of metal films on an ionic liquid as a basis for a lunar telescope", Ermanno F. Borra, Omar Seddiki, Roger Angel, Daniel Eisenstein, Paul Hickson, Kenneth R. Seddon, and Simon P. Worden, Nature, 2007, 447, 979.
