= Victoria Meadows =

American astronomer

Victoria Suzanne Meadows is a Professor with the Astronomy Department and Director of the Astrobiology Program at the University of Washington. She is also the Principal Investigator for the NASA Astrobiology Institute's Virtual Planetary Laboratory Lead Team and the chair of the NAI Focus Group on Habitability and Astronomical Biosignatures (HAB). The research direction of the team is to create computer models that can be used to understand planet formation, stability and orbital evolution, and to simulate the environment and spectra of planets that can potentially be habitable.

She obtained her B.Sc. in physics from the University of New South Wales, and a Ph.D. in physics from the Astrophysics Department of the University of Sydney.

Scientific American consulted her for comments when the Kepler space telescope mission discovered large numbers of planets orbiting distant stars.

== Research ==
Meadows’ main research focus is to determine processes to identify whether an extrasolar planet is able to support life. With her Virtual Planetary Laboratory, she develops computer models to understand the process by which planets form, their stability and orbital evolution. The models are used to help design and develop planet detection missions which focus on the most promising tests. In 2015, she co-published a new metric called the “habitability index for transiting planets” which aims to help prioritize where to conduct closer inspections among the thousands of exoplanets being discovered, with the best prospects for identifying signs of life beyond Earth.

One of the key factors is to test for the presence of oxygen on candidate planets, so her team of 75 researchers in 2016 were investigating how to distinguish false positive signals from true signs of biological activity.

In 2020, she co-authored research into spectral analysis of gas on Venus. She pointed out that signs which had originally been interpreted as the gas phosphine (a possible sign of life) could instead be sulfur dioxide (which is not considered a sign of life).

As of 2026, Google Scholar reports that her publications have a total of 20000 citations, with an h-index of 70.

== Awards ==
In 2018, the SETI Institute awarded her their Drake Award "in recognition of her contributions to the field of astrobiology and her work as a researcher, leader and inspiration for everyone working in her field". She was the first woman to receive this award.
