= Self-licking ice cream cone =

Self-perpetuating system with no other purpose

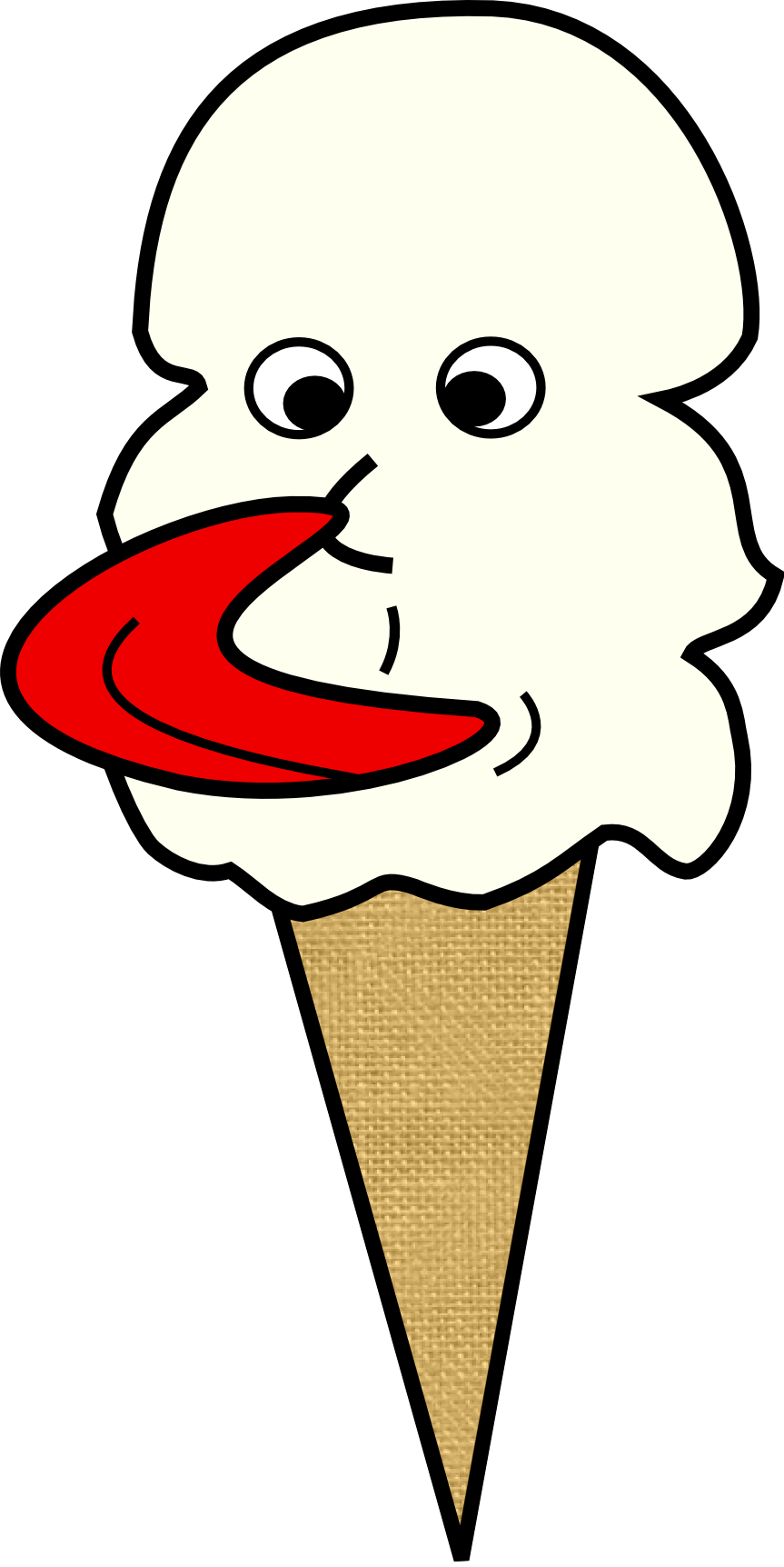
An illustration of the metaphor

In political jargon, a self-licking ice cream cone is a self-perpetuating system that has no purpose other than to sustain itself.

== History ==
The phrase appeared to have been first used in 1991–1992, in a book about Gulf War weapons systems by Norman Friedman, and On Self-Licking Ice Cream Cones, a paper by Pete Worden about NASA's bureaucracy, to describe the relationship between the Space Shuttle and Space Station.

Since then, the term has been used to describe the purported habit of government-funded organisations and programs spending taxpayer money to lobby for more funding from the taxpayer. Other things compared have included financial bubbles, chatshows and reality television. In The Irish Times, Kevin Courtney observed that "many organisations are also stuck in limbo, destined to keep lurching on without ever achieving their stated goal. That’s because their real goal is simply to carry on regardless." The Cold War infrastructure has also been compared to a self-licking ice cream cone, given that expensive projects continued to be financed long after world communism had ceased to pose a viable threat.

Richard Hoggart used the term to describe certain United Nations programmes.

Franklin C. Spinney used the term to refer to the military–industrial complex.

== See also ==
- Boondoggle
- Circular reasoning
- Ouroboros
- Self-fulfilling prophecy
- Useless machine
- Virtuous circle and vicious circle
