= Astrobiology Society of Britain =

UK learned society

The Astrobiology Society of Britain (ASB) is a learned society dedicated to the understanding and advancement of astrobiology in the United Kingdom. The organisation is affiliated with NASA.

The society is mainly made up of members from the United Kingdom but also has international members. The society was created in 2003, when it emerged from the e-mailing list-based UK Astrobiology Forum and Network at the UK's first Astrobiology Conference in 2003 in Cambridge.

The ASB has official affiliations with the Royal Astronomical Society and the NASA Astrobiology Institute.
