= NASA Astrobiology Institute =

U.S. research organization

- Abbreviation: NAI
- Formation: 1998
- Dissolved: 2019
- Headquarters: NASA Ames Research Center
- Location: Mountain View, California
- Director: Penelope Boston
- Parent organization: NASA
- Budget: $16 million (2008)
- Website: nai.nasa.gov

The NASA Astrobiology Institute (NAI) was established in 1998 by the National Aeronautics and Space Administration (NASA) "to develop the field of astrobiology and provide a scientific framework for flight missions." In December 2019 the institute's activities were suspended.

The NAI is a virtual, distributed organization that integrates astrobiology research and training programs in concert with the national and international science communities.

== History ==
Although NASA had explored the idea of forming an astrobiology institute in the past, when the Viking biological experiments returned negative results for life on Mars, the public lost interest and federal funds for exobiology dried up. In 1996, the announcement of possible traces of ancient life in the Allan Hills 84001 meteorite from Mars led to new interest in the subject. At the same time, NASA developed the Origins Program, broadening its reach from exobiology to astrobiology, the study of the origin, evolution, distribution, and future of life in the universe.

In 1998, $9 million was set aside to fund the NASA Astrobiology Institute (NAI), an interdisciplinary research effort using the expertise of different scientific research institutions and universities from across the country, centrally linked to Ames Research Center in Mountain View, California. Gerald Soffen former Project Scientist with the Viking program, helped coordinate the new institute. In May, NASA selected eleven science teams, each with a Principal Investigator (PI). NAI was established in July with Scott Hubbard as interim Director. Nobel laureate Baruch S. Blumberg was appointed the first Director of the institute, and served from May 15, 1999 – October 14, 2002.

== Program ==
The NASA Astrobiology Program includes the NAI as one of four components, including the Exobiology and Evolutionary Biology Program; the Astrobiology Science and Technology Instrument Development (ASTID) Program; and the Astrobiology Science and Technology for Exploring Planets (ASTEP) Program. Program budgets for fiscal year 2008 were as follows: NAI, $16 million; Grants for the Exobiology and Evolutionary Biology Program, $11 million; ASTID, $9 million; ASTEP, $5 million.

== Teams ==
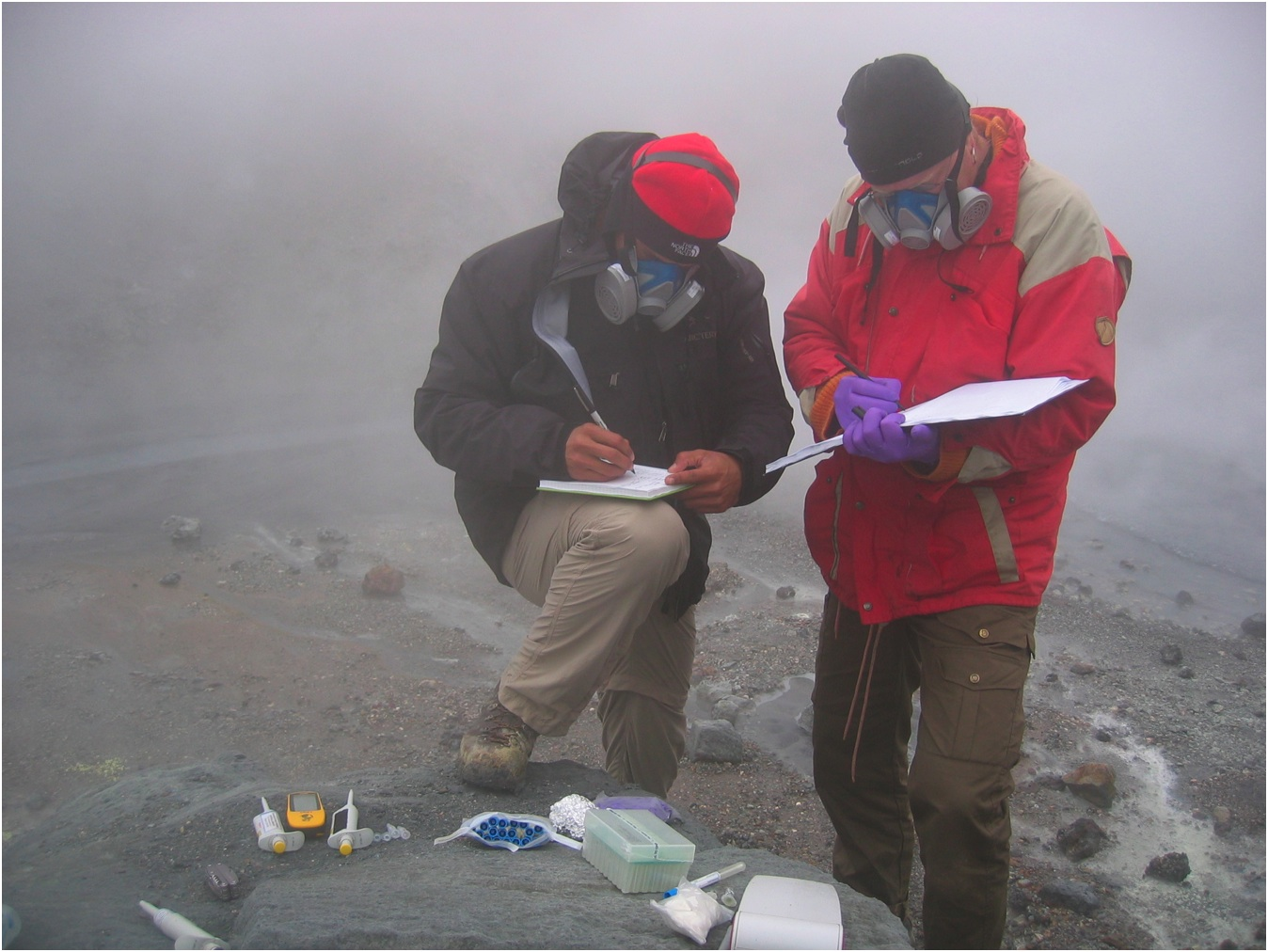
Joint Russian-NASA Astrobiology Institute (NAI) expedition studying microbial life in extreme environments in the crater of Mutnovsky Volcano in Kamchatka, far east Russia.

As of 2018, the NAI has 10 teams including about 600 researchers distributed across ~100 institutions. It also has 13 international partner organizations. Some past and present teams are:

- Arizona State University
- Carnegie Institution of Washington
- Georgia Institute of Technology
- Harvard University
- Indiana University
- Jet Propulsion Laboratory
- Johnson Space Center
- Massachusetts Institute of Technology
- Marine Biological Laboratory
- Michigan State University
- Montana State University
- NASA Ames Research Center
- NASA Goddard Space Flight Center
- Pennsylvania State University
- Rutgers University
- Rensselaer Polytechnic Institute
- Scripps Research Institute
- SETI Institute
- University of Arizona
- University of California, Berkeley
- University of California, Los Angeles
- University of California, Santa Cruz
- University of Colorado, Boulder
- University of Hawaiʻi at Mānoa
- University of Rhode Island
- University of Washington
- University of Wisconsin
- Virtual Planetary Laboratory

=== International partners ===
NAI has partnership program with other international astrobiology organizations to provide collaborative opportunities for its researchers within the global science community.

==== Associate Partners ====
- Spain Astrobiology Center (CAB) at the Instituto Nacional de Técnica Aeroespacial, Madrid, Spain
- Australian Centre for Astrobiology (ACA) at the University of New South Wales

==== Affiliate Partners ====
- Astrobiology Society of Britain (ASB)
- Canadian Astrobiology Network (CAN) at Centre for Planetary Science and Exploration (CPSX), at the University of Western Ontario
- European Exo/Astrobiology Network Association (EANA)
- Helmholtz Alliance: Planetary Evolution and Life
- Instituto de Astrobiología Colombia (IAC)
- Japan AstroBiology Consortium (JABC), a partnership of the Earth-Life Science Institute and the National Institutes of Natural Sciences
- Nordic Network of Astrobiology
- Russian Astrobiology Center (RAC)
- Sociedad Mexicana de Astrobiología (SOMA)
- Société Française d’Exobiologie (SFE)
- UK Centre for Astrobiology at The University of Edinburgh
- University of São Paulo (USP)

== Research ==
Selected, significant topics of interdisciplinary research by NAI as of 2008:

- Comets in space and in the laboratory
- Discovery of the "rare biosphere"
- Early habitability of Earth
- Early wet Mars
- Exoplanet discovery and analysis
- Life without the Sun
- Metal isotope tracers of environment and biology
- Methane on Mars
- Microbial mat ecology
- Modeling exoplanet biospheres
- Origins of life
- Snowball Earth
- Sub-seafloor life
- The rise of oxygen and Earth's "middle age"
