= Automated Planet Finder =

Robotic optical telescope searching for extrasolar planets

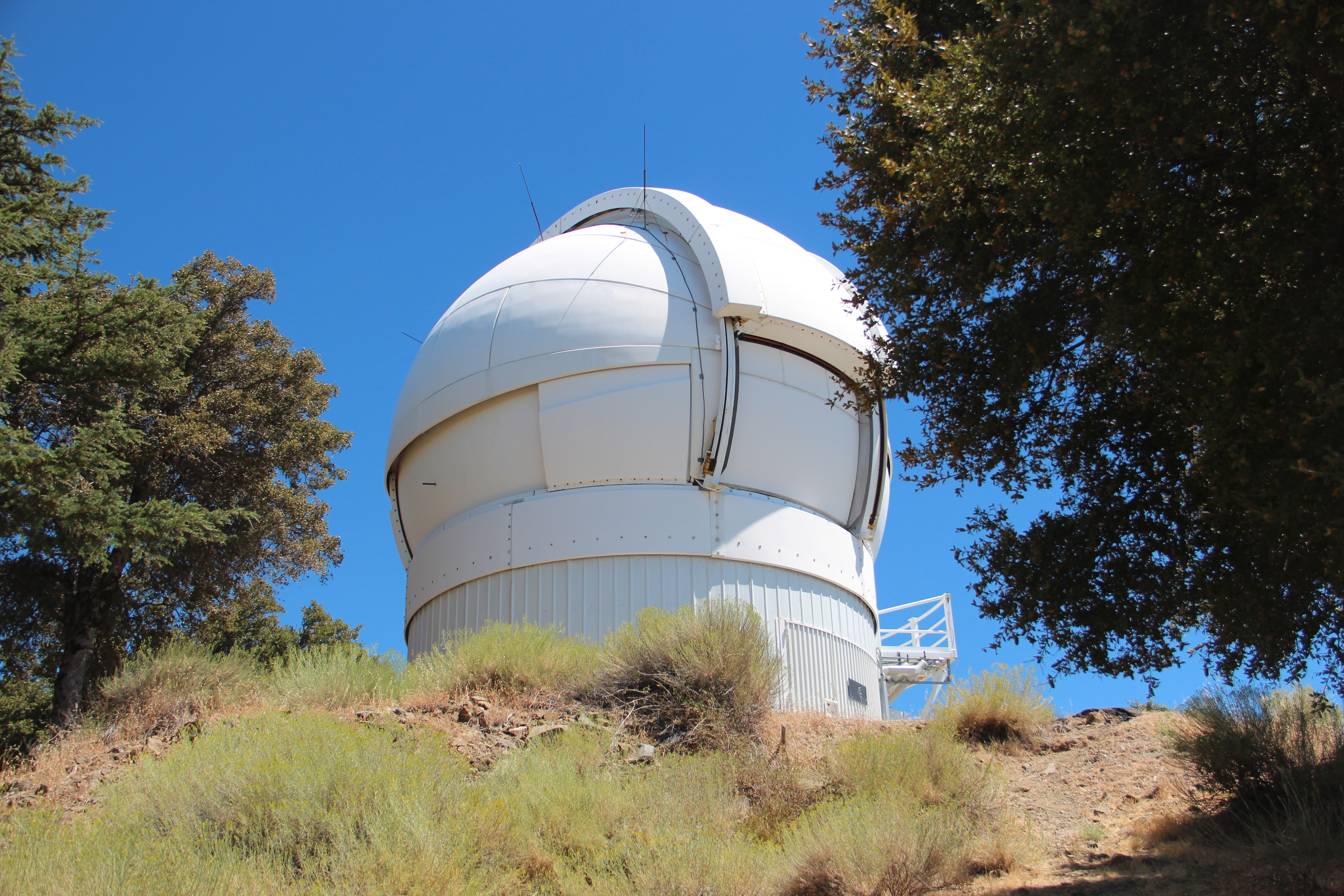
- Alternative names: APF
- Location(s): Santa Clara County, California, Pacific States Region
- Coordinates: 37°20′33″N 121°38′18″W
- Altitude: 1,280 m (4,200 ft)
- Diameter: 2.4 m (7 ft 10 in)
- Website: apf.ucolick.org/index.html
- Location of Automated Planet Finder
- Related media on Commons

The Automated Planet Finder (APF) Telescope a.k.a. Rocky Planet Finder, is a fully robotic 2.4-meter optical telescope at Lick Observatory, situated on the summit of Mount Hamilton, east of San Jose, California, USA. It is designed to search for extrasolar planets in the range of five to twenty times the mass of the Earth. The instrument will examine about 10 stars per night. Over the span of a decade, the telescope is expected to study 1,000 nearby stars for planets. Its estimated cost was $10 million. The total cost-to-completion of the APF project was $12.37 million. First light was originally scheduled for 2006, but delays in the construction of the major components of the telescope pushed this back to August 2013. It was commissioned in August 2013.

The telescope uses high-precision radial velocity measurements to measure the gravitational reflex motion of nearby stars caused by the orbiting of planets. The design goal is to detect stellar motions as small as one meter per second, comparable to a slow walking speed. The main targets will be stars within about 100 light years of the Earth.

Early tests show that the performance of the Ken and Gloria Levy Doppler Spectrometer is meeting the design goals. The spectrometer has high throughput and is meeting the design sensitivity of (1.0 m/s), similar to the radial velocity precision of HARPS and HIRES.

== Construction ==
Parts for the telescopes were constructed by international companies:

- The mirror blank was cast in Russia.
- The blank was optical figured in Maryland, USA.
- Assembly was performed in Arizona, USA.
- The dome was built in Australia.
- The spectrograph was designed and built in California.
- It is located on Mount Hamilton in California.

== Collaboration with Breakthrough Listen ==
The telescope is also being used to search for optical signals coming from laser transmissions from hypothetical extraterrestrial civilizations (search for extraterrestrial intelligence - SETI). This undertaking is performed for the heavily funded Breakthrough Listen project of the Berkeley SETI Research Center.

== See also ==
- List of large optical telescopes
- List of astronomical observatories
