= Human Proteome Folding Project =

World Community Grid volunteer computing project

The Human Proteome Folding Project (HPF) is a collaborative effort between New York University (Bonneau Lab), the Institute for Systems Biology (ISB) and the University of Washington (Baker Lab), using the Rosetta software developed by the Rosetta Commons. The project is managed by the Bonneau lab.

HPF Phase 1 applied Rosetta v4.2x software on the human genome and 89 others, starting in November 2004. Phase 1 ended in July 2006. HPF Phase 2 (HPF2) applies the Rosetta v4.8x software in higher resolution, "full atom refinement" mode, concentrating on cancer biomarkers (proteins found at dramatically increased levels in cancer tissues), human secreted proteins and malaria.

Phase 1 ran on two volunteer computing grids: on United Devices' grid.org, and on the World Community Grid, an IBM philanthropic initiative. Phase 2 of the project ran exclusively on the World Community Grid; it terminated in 2013 after more than 9 years of IBM involvement.

The Institute for Systems Biology will use the results of the computations within its larger research efforts.

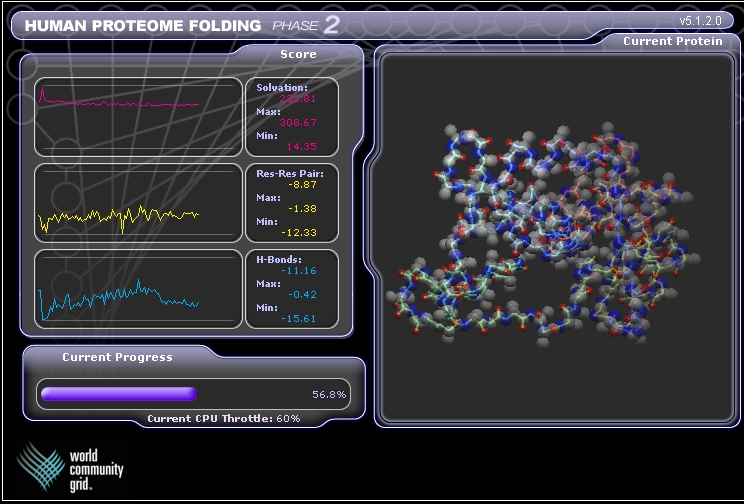
WCG screensaver, Human Proteome Folding Project Phase2, running under UD client software

== Publications ==
- Malmström, Lars; Riffle, Michael; Strauss, Charlie E. M.; Chivian, Dylan; Davis, Trisha N.; Baker, David; Baker, D (2007), "Superfamily Assignments for the Yeast Proteome through Integration of Structure Prediction with the Gene Ontology", PLOS Biology, 5 (4): e76, doi:10.1371/journal.pbio.0050076, PMC 1828141, PMID 17373854
- Drew, K; Winters, P; Butterfoss, GL; Berstis, V; Uplinger, K; Armstrong, J; Riffle, M; Schweighofer, E; Bovermann, B; Goodlett, DR; Davis, TN; Shasha, D; Malmström, L; Bonneau, R (November 2011). "The Proteome Folding Project: proteome-scale prediction of structure and function". Genome Research. 21 (11): 1981–94. doi:10.1101/gr.121475.111. PMC 3205581. PMID 21824995.*
- Baltz, AG; Munschauer, M; Schwanhäusser, B; Vasile, A; Murakawa, Y; Schueler, M; Youngs, N; Penfold-Brown, D; Drew, K; Milek, M; Wyler, E; Bonneau, R; Selbach, M; Dieterich, C; Landthaler, M (8 June 2012). "The mRNA-bound proteome and its global occupancy profile on protein-coding transcripts". Molecular Cell. 46 (5): 674–90. doi:10.1016/j.molcel.2012.05.021. PMID 22681889. (Used fold enrichment and function predictions)
- Wang, KH; Isidro, AL; Domingues, L; Eskandarian, HA; McKenney, PT; Drew, K; Grabowski, P; Chua, MH; Barry, SN; Guan, M; Bonneau, R; Henriques, AO; Eichenberger, P (November 2009). "The coat morphogenetic protein SpoVID is necessary for spore encasement in Bacillus subtilis". Molecular Microbiology. 74 (3): 634–49. doi:10.1111/j.1365-2958.2009.06886.x. PMC 2806667. PMID 19775244. (Used predictions as hypothesis for further experimental characterization)

== See also ==
- BOINC
- Folding@home
- Foldit
- Human proteome project
- List of volunteer computing projects
