= Discovering Dengue Drugs – Together =

World Community Grid volunteer computing subproject

Discovering Dengue Drugs – Together (DDDT) was a World Community Grid project launched in 2007 sponsored by scientists at the University of Texas Medical Branch at Galveston and the University of Chicago. Its goal was to identify new antiviral drugs effective against viruses from the family Flaviviridae. The project closed in 2015.

Like all World Community Grid projects, Discovering Dengue Drugs – Together used a computational grid made up of thousands of client computers belonging to independent volunteers, in conjunction with servers that distribute portions of the work to the clients.

== Phase 1 ==
The first phase of the project launched on August 21, 2007 and used AutoDock 2007 (the same software used for FightAIDS@Home) to test how well antiviral drug candidates are predicted to bind to the target virus's proteases. The specific viruses targeted by the project were:

- Dengue virus
- Hepatitis C virus
- West Nile virus
- Yellow fever virus

Compounds predicted to bind strongly (protease inhibitors) were identified as potential antiviral drug candidates. Around 2.2 million compounds were examined in Phase 1, with around 20,000 of the best scoring compounds being passed to the second phase of the project.

In 2008, the project was temporarily suspended because of Hurricane Ike. Processing resumed in January 2009, with the server function transferred from the University of Texas Medical Branch in Galveston to the Texas Advanced Computing Center in Austin. Phase 1 ended in August 2009.

== Phase 2 ==
The second phase of the project was designed to reduce the number of false positive predictions made during Phase 1, using the CHARMM software package to predict how tightly small drug-like molecules bind to the different flavivirus proteases.

Drug candidates that make it through Phase 2 were lab-tested, and in 2014, a novel small-molecule inhibitor of dengue virus protease was announced. Phase 2 of the project was closed in March 2015.
