= United Devices =

A privately held, commercial volunteer computing company

United Devices, Inc.
- Type: Private
- Industry: Volunteer computing, Grid computing, Computer software
- Founded: Austin, Texas (1999)
- Defunct: September 17, 2007
- Fate: merged with Univa to form Univa UD
- Successor: Univa
- Headquarters: Austin, Texas
- Products: Grid MP, Insight, Synergy, Reliance
- Revenue: $3.30 M (as of 2007)
- Number of employees: 50 (as of 2007)
- Website: www.univaud.com

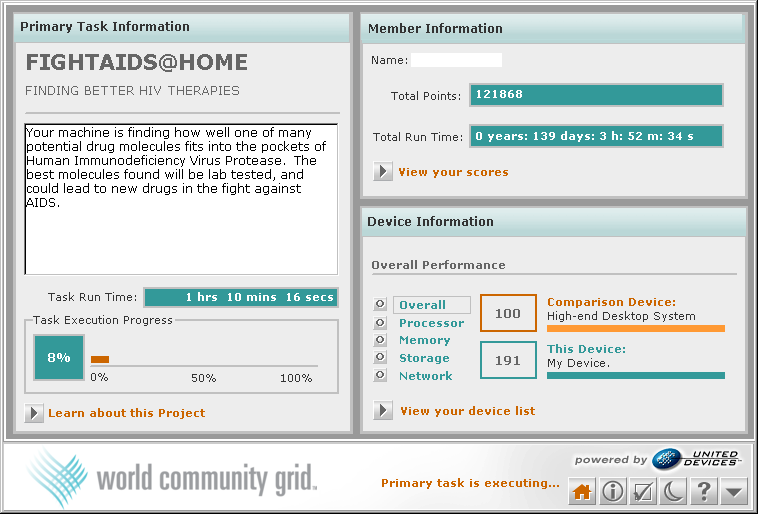
World Community Grid member processing the task FightAIDS@Home with United Devices client software.

United Devices, Inc. was a privately held, commercial volunteer computing company that focused on the use of grid computing to manage high-performance computing systems and enterprise cluster management. Its products and services allowed users to "allocate workloads to computers and devices throughout enterprises, aggregating computing power that would normally go unused." It operated under the name Univa UD for a time, after merging with Univa on September 17, 2007.

== History ==
Founded in 1999 in Austin, Texas, United Devices began with volunteer computing expertise from distributed.net and SETI@home, although only a few of the original technical staff from those organizations remained through the years.

In April 2001, grid.org was formally announced as a philanthropic non-profit website to demonstrate the benefits of Internet-based large scale grid computing.

Later in 2002 with help from UD, NTT Data launched a similar Internet-based Cell Computing project targeting Japanese users. In 2004, IBM and United Devices worked together to start the World Community Grid project as another demonstration of Internet-based grid computing.

In August 2005, United Devices acquired the Paris-based GridXpert company and added Synergy to its product lineup.

In 2006, the company acknowledged seeing an industry shift from only using grid computing for compute-intensive applications towards data center automation and business application optimization.

Partly in response to the market shifts and reorganization, grid.org was shut down on April 27, 2007, after completing its mission to "demonstrate the viability and benefits of large-scale Internet-based grid computing".

On September 17, 2007, the company announced that it would merge with the Lisle, Illinois-based Univa and operate under the new name Univa UD. The combined company would offer open source solutions based around Globus Toolkit, while continuing to sell its existing grid products and support its existing customers.

On June 26, 2008, United Devices client software on World Community Grid finished its role and completely relayed to BOINC's.

== Commercial products ==
- Grid MP — a job scheduler and application provisioning platform. It is offered in various editions, depending on the scalability needs of the customer. The company publishes a list of high-profile organizations using Grid MP on the United Devices website.
- MP Insight — allows customers to perform data analysis to determine if their grid computing resources are being effectively used.
- MP Synergy — a metascheduler based on Globus Toolkit technology that allows users to perform efficient scheduling within an organization that has multiple job schedulers already deployed and controlling independent clusters. Supported schedulers include Grid MP, Sun Grid Engine, Platform LSF, PBS, LoadLeveler, and Condor.
- Reliance — designed specifically for the datacenter to provide automated infrastructure management and to ensure application service levels are honored by monitoring events and performing provisioning actions based on these events.

== Public philanthropy ==
From 2001 until 2007, United Devices operated a series of public projects on their grid.org website as part of a philanthropic effort. It also acted as a marketing tool, helping to spread awareness of the Grid MP product and demonstrating the platform's scalability. Some of the costs associated with operating the past projects on grid.org have been financially sponsored in part by companies including Microsoft, Intel, and IBM.

On April 27, 2007, United Devices closed down grid.org and the Cancer Research Project with the announcement that it "has completed its mission to demonstrate the viability and benefits of large-scale Internet-based grid computing."

== See also ==
- Volunteer computing
- Grid computing
- CPU scavenging
- Job scheduler
