= Décrypthon =

- Available in: English, French
- Type: Grid computing and Volunteer computing
- Website: afm-telethon.fr/projet-decrypthon-3149

Décrypthon is a project which uses grid computing resources to contribute to medical research. The word is a portmanteau of the French word "décrypter" (to decipher) and "telethon".

== Description ==
Décrypthon is a technology platform providing the computational power required to process complex data in biology. It allows, through technologies called "grids", to gather (in a grid) the capacity of several supercomputers (500 Gflop) installed by IBM in 6 French universities (Bordeaux 1, Lille 1, Paris 6 Jussieu, ENS Lyon, Crihan in Rouen, Orsay) and/or individual personal computers via the World Community Grid, itself a BOINC project. A dozen scientific projects selected through a call for tenders have been completed under the Décrypthon program.

== History ==
During the 2001 French Telethon, the AFM ("Association française contre les myopathies" / "French Association Against Myopathy") and IBM launched a call to mobilize Internet users: "Make your unused computer time available to research". Objective: Accomplish the first proteome mapping: all the proteins/molecules produced by cells.

This scientific, technological and human challenge was brilliantly taken up: 75,000 Internet users mobilized, billions of complex calculations performed, 550,000 proteins mapped. It is a library for comparing proteins from different species of living organisms (animal, plant, human). It contains nearly 2.2 million files divided into 17,000 directories.

All this in less than two months whereas it would have taken more than 1,170 years to achieve with a single computer. Each computer contributed about 133 hours, or more than 10 million hours of calculations in total. Twenty-one IBM servers coordinated the solutions and data throughout the operation.

Following this success, in 2003 the AFM launched a call for tenders to promote the use of this knowledge base. Four projects were selected:

- A project was proposed by two teams from Commissariat à l'Energie Atomique (CEA, Commission for Atomic Energy) Department of Life Sciences at Saclay (S Zinn-Justin and R Guérois) in association with A Poupon, from the National Center of Scientific Research (Centre Nationale de la recherche scientifique ou CNRS), Laboratory of yeast structural genomics from the University of Orsay. This project aimed to study the relationships between structure and function of proteins that reduce the risk of genetic abnormalities in humans and yeast.

Three other teams from the IGBMC (Institut de génétique et de biologie moléculaire et cellulaire, Genomics Institute of molecular and cellular biology) in Illkirch, J Laporte and J-L Mandel, A Pujol and J-L Mandel, G Bey, F Sirockin, F Plevwniak and O Poch proposed three projects of increasing complexity.

- The first project involved the identification and characterization of proteins implicated in several neuromuscular diseases, as well as the prediction of protein domains and tissue-specific functions.
- A second project involved the analysis of proteins of a cellular organelle, the peroxisome, which is involved in many essential metabolic functions.
- The third project, at the scale of an organism, was to identify new potential therapeutic targets in Vibrio cholerae and bacterial diarrhea organisms involved in diarrhoeal diseases

Two projects were selected in 2003/2004. Both projects were successfully carried out on the grid and provided useful calculations.

Following the success of these two projects, an agreement was signed in May 2004 between the AFM, the CNRS and IBM formalizing the then named “Décrypthon based” project on a grid of servers donated by IBM at six partner universities.

In 2009, the French actor Thierry Lhermitte becomes the patron of Décrypthon.

== Projects ==
- Project coordinated by Alessandra Carbone (Inserm Unit 511, Université Pierre et Marie Curie). Large-scale investigation of protein-protein, protein-DNA and protein-ligand interactions leading to drug targeting. This project seeks to develop computer tools to identify at the protein surface, interaction sites with other proteins, DNA or ligands.
- Project of Christophe Pouzat and Pascal Viot (CNRS UMR 8118, Université René Descartes, Paris V). Parallelization of a Monte Carlo method to sort action potentials: improving a tool for basic research in neuroscience and diagnosis of neuromuscular diseases. This project aims to automate the processing of neuronal signals recorded by doctors to detect any malfunctioning of neurons in the brain or motoneurons that control muscle fibres.
- Project coordinated by Marc Robinson-Rechavi (Faculty of Biology and Medicine at the University of Lausanne/ENS Lyon). Data mining of animal transcriptomes to annotate the neuromuscular processes of the human genome. This project will allow to identify exactly which genes should be expressed (or are incorrectly expressed) in muscle cells, essential information to understand neuromuscular diseases.
- Project coordinated by E-K. Talbi (LIFL – Laboratory of Basic Computer Science in Lille, USTL, CNRS, INRIA, Villeneuve d'Ascq). Conformational sampling and docking on Grids: Application to neuromuscular diseases. The aim is to predict, by calculation, the nature and type of bonds of the molecules involved in the functioning of the normal cell, and to develop research "in silico" (by calculation), the means to interfere with the normal or pathological physiological processes - and therefore to rationally develop medication.
- Project coordinated by F. Relaix and O. Poch (Institute of Myology, Paris - IGBMC, Illkirch). Large-scale identification of transcriptional networks during myogenesis. This project aims to identify the molecular mechanisms of transcription in the development of muscle.
- Project coordinated by M. Robinson-Rechavi and L. Schaeffer (Faculty of Biology and Medicine at the University of Lausanne/ENS Lyon). Integration of multiple approaches of functional genomics to understand the muscle.
