= Grid MP =

- Developer(s): Univa (formerly known as United Devices, Inc)
- Stable release: 5.8 / 2011 April
- Operating system: Linux, Windows, Mac OS X, AIX, Solaris, HP-UX
- Type: distributed computing
- License: Proprietary
- Website: univa.com

Grid MP is a commercial distributed computing software package developed and sold by Univa (formerly known as United Devices), a privately held company based primarily in Austin, Texas. It was formerly known as the MetaProcessor prior to the release of version 4.0, however the letters MP in Grid MP do not officially stand for anything.

== Product features ==
Grid MP provides job scheduling with prioritization, user security restrictions, selective application exclusion, user-activity detection, and time-of-day execution controls.

Grid MP can be used to manage computational Devices consisting of corporate desktop PCs, departmental servers, or dedicated cluster nodes. Computational Devices can be arranged into Device Groups for organizational, security, and administrative control.

Grid MP has been demonstrated as being capable of managing grids of large numbers of nodes during its use in the infrastructure of the grid.org and World Community Grid projects (the World Community Grid project migrated to the open-source Berkeley Open Infrastructure for Network Computing software in 2007). Despite its ability to "scale seamlessly to hundreds of thousands of device nodes" it is also suitable for smaller clusters of enterprise servers or workstations.

=== MGSI ===
MP Grid Services Interface, or simply MGSI, offers a web service API (via SOAP and XML-RPC protocols over HTTP). It enables developers of back-end application services to access and manipulate objects within the system. Access to the API and all objects is access controlled and security restricted on a per-object basis. Since MGSI is a web service protocol, any programming language that has a SOAP or XML-RPC library available can be used to interface with it, although commonly C++, Java, Perl, and PHP are used.

=== Management Console ===
A web-based MP Management Console, or simply MPMC, provides administrators with a simplified and easy-to-use interface to monitor system activity, control security settings, and manage system objects. The MPMC is written in the PHP programming language, and uses the MGSI web service for all of its interactions with the system.

=== MP Agent ===
The MP Agent (known as the UD Agent in versions before 4.0) is the software agent that must be installed on each computer that will participate in a Grid MP installation by running jobs. Once the MP Agent is installed on a computer, it is officially recognized by the Grid MP as a Device.

As of Grid MP Enterprise version 5.5, the MP Agent is supported on the following platforms:

- Microsoft Windows on x86
- Linux on x86, IA-64, x86-64
- Solaris on SPARC
- AIX on PowerPC
- Mac OS X on PowerPC and x86
- HP-UX on IA-64
