= FAAH (disambiguation) =

FAAH is an abbreviation, acronym, or initialism that may refer to:

- Fatty acid amide hydrolase, a protein found in cell membranes
- FightAIDS@Home, a distributed computing project
- Foil Arms and Hog, an Irish comedy troupe
