= Univa Grid Engine =

Batch-queuing system to schedule resources in a data center

Univa Grid Engine Software
- Developer: Univa
- Stable release: 8.6.15 / 28 August 2020; 6 years ago
- Operating system: Cross-platform
- Type: Grid computing Supercomputing
- License: Proprietary commercial software
- Website: www.altair.com/grid-engine/
- Repository: github.com/gridengine/gridengine

Univa Grid Engine (UGE) is a batch-queuing system, forked from Sun Grid Engine (SGE). The software schedules resources in a data center applying user-configurable policies to help improve resource sharing and throughput by maximizing resource utilization. The product can be deployed to run on-premises, using IaaS cloud computing or in a hybrid cloud environment.

== History ==
The roots of Grid Engine as a commercial product date back to 1993 (under the names CODINE and later, in a variation of the product, GRD). A more comprehensive genealogy of the product is described in Sun Grid Engine. Grid Engine was first distributed by Genias Software and from 1999, after a company merger, by Gridware, Inc. In 2000, Sun Microsystems acquired Gridware. Sun renamed CODINE/GRD as Sun Grid Engine later that year, and released it as open-source in 2001.

In 2010, Oracle Corporation acquired Sun and subsequently renamed SGE to Oracle Grid Engine. Oracle Grid Engine (6.2u6) moved to a closed-source model providing binaries with the distribution but no source code. As a result, the project's open-source repository no longer reflected changes made by Oracle and users were prevented from contributing code changes. In response to this, the Grid Engine community started the Open Grid Scheduler and the Son of Grid Engine projects to continue to develop and maintain a free implementation of Grid Engine. The University of Michigan has been maintaining the Son of Grid Engine code publicly since 2019.

On January 18, 2011, Univa announced that it had hired the principal engineers from the Sun Grid Engine team. Univa Grid Engine development is led by CTO Fritz Ferstl, who founded the Grid Engine project and ran the business within Sun/Oracle for the past 10 years.

On October 22, 2013, Univa announced that it had acquired Oracle Grid Engine assets and intellectual property, making it the sole commercial provider of Grid Engine software.

Between 2011 and 2013 Univa added new capabilities to Univa Grid Engine including Univa Unisight, and Univa License Orchestrator.

Univa Unisight provided new reporting and analytics capabilities related to Univa Grid Engine workloads and infrastructure. Univa License Orchestrator extended Univa Grid Engine scheduling policies to support allocation and optimization of commercial software licenses, an important capability in electronic design automation (EDA) and other industries.

On June 24, 2018, Univa announced massive scalability operating a single cluster with over 1 million cores on Amazon Web Services (AWS).

In September 2020, Altair Engineering, a global technology company providing solutions in data analytics, product development, and high-performance computing (HPC) acquired Univa.

In 2023, the lead developers of Sun Grid Engine, Oracle Grid Engine, Univa Grid Engine, and its successor decided to create the Gridware Cluster Scheduler (GCS). This new system is based on their open-source Open Cluster Scheduler, which is fully backward compatible with "SGE."

== See also ==
- Job Scheduler and Batch Queuing for Clusters
- Beowulf cluster
- Maui Cluster Scheduler
- Open Source Cluster Application Resources (OSCAR)
- Slurm Workload Manager
- TORQUE
