= Top7 =

Artificial protein

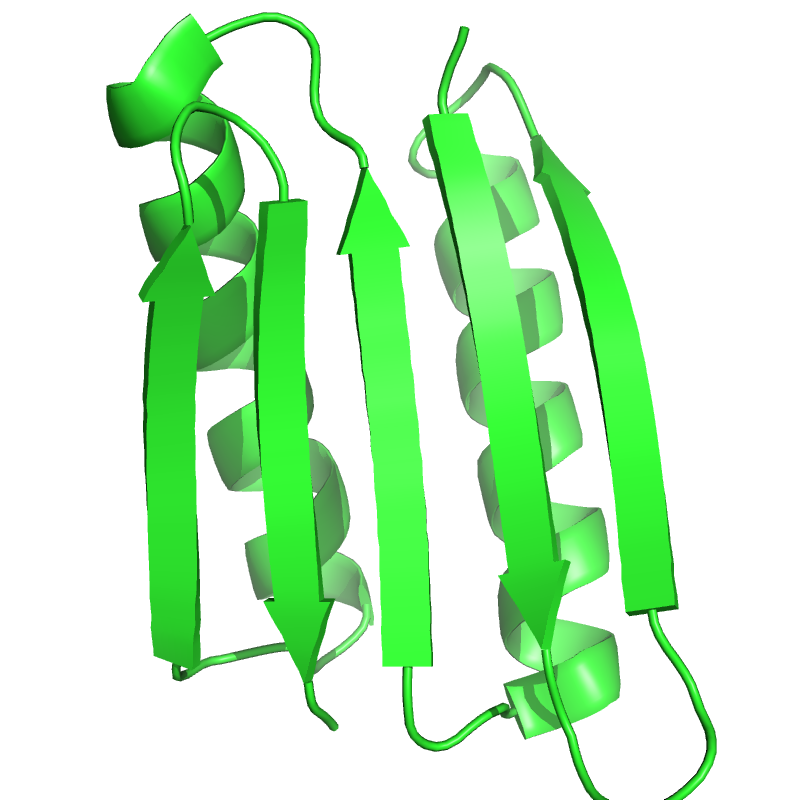
Ribbon diagram of Top7.

Top7 is an artificial protein, classified as a de novo protein. This means that the protein itself was designed to have a specific structure and functional properties.

== Background ==
Top7 was designed by Brian Kuhlman and Gautam Dantas in David Baker's laboratory at the University of Washington. Top7's design was built through the use of a general computational method that repeated its sequence design and structure prediction. The end goal was to develop a 93-residue α/β protein with a new sequence and arrangement of its structure, or topology. These computational methods helped to design the proteins along with protein structure prediction algorithms.

The resulting sequence of residues is:

DIQVQVNIDDNGKNFDYTYTVTTESELQKVLNELKDYIKKQGAKRVRISITARTKKEAEKFAAILIKVFAELGYNDINVTFDGDTVTVEGQLE

== Structure ==
Due to the de novo design, Top7 possesses a unique three-dimensional structure. The protein is described as a 93-residue α/β protein, which suggest that Top7 contains both alpha helices,α, and beta sheets, β, in its secondary structure. Overall, the structure consists of two alpha helices packed on a five-stranded anti-parallel beta sheet. The combination of alpha helices and beta sheets is seen commonly in protein structures; this contributes to the overall stability and functionality of the protein.

In order to achieve a target structure, researchers first developed a two-dimensional diagram and utilized it to determine the constraints that allowed them to construct the three-dimensional model of Top7. Determination of the high-resolution X-ray structure of the experimentally expressed and purified protein revealed that the structure (PDB: 1QYS) was indeed very similar (1.2 Å RMSD) to the computer-designed model.

== Characterization ==
Researchers used a variety of biophysical methods in order to characterize the Top7 protein. These processes were able to define certain characteristics to describe the protein. Gel filtration chromatography was used to determined that Top7 is monomeric and is highly soluble. It was also discovered that an increase in temperature allows the protein to unfold cooperatively and displays cold denaturation. Crystallization trials with Top7 design resulted in negligible differences in nuclear magnetic resonance therefore the design model exhibited a structure very similar to the true structure. Structure-Based models were used to further studying folding characteristics of Top7.

Through these analyzes, it was determined that the Top7 protein is extremely stable.

== Folding kinetics ==
Top7 exhibits non-cooperative folding behavior. Many naturally occurring proteins display cooperative folding, indicating that the whole structure folds in a coordinated procedure. In contrast, the folding of Top7 does not follow a smooth, single phase process. Its non-cooperative characteristic may be linked to its designed sequence, which promotes the formation of an independently folded C-terminal intermediate structure. Studies found that mutations in C-terminal as well as N-terminal of the amino acid sequence of a base model prove that there is a probable sequence of Top7 that allows fold cooperative folding.

== Implications ==
The creation of the de novo protein Top7 showcases the capability of computational methods in creating proteins with specific three-dimensional structures. This has broad implications for advancing the field of computational protein design and provides a platform for the creation of novel biomolecules with desired properties. The stability and folding characteristics of Top7 provide insights into the relationship between sequence, structure, and folding cooperativity. Understanding these principles can contribute to the development of more stable and functional proteins not derived from natural evolution.

Top7 was featured as the RCSB Protein Data Bank's 'Molecule of the Month' in October 2005, and a superposition of the respective cores (residues 60-79) of its predicted and X-ray crystal structures are featured in the Rosetta@home logo.
