= 3D-Jury =

Bioinformatics software to aggregate protein structure predictions

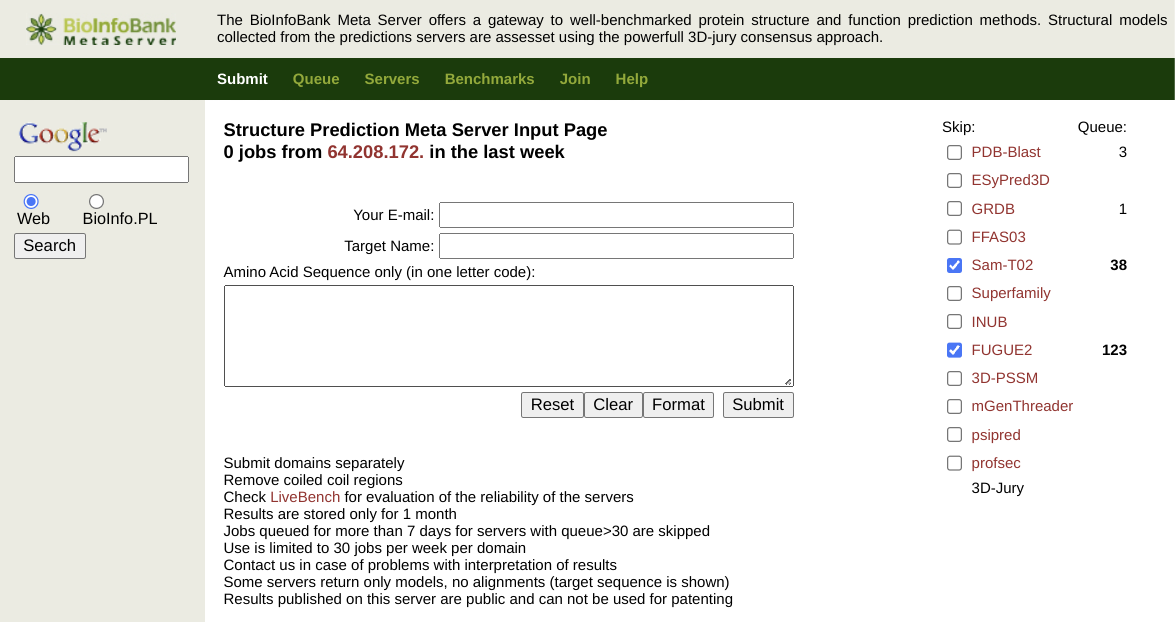
Screenshot of Structure Prediction Meta Server, 3D-Jury, web interface from the Wayback Machine

3D-Jury is a metaserver that aggregates and compares models from various protein structure prediction servers.

The 3D-Jury algorithm takes in groups of predictions made by a collection of servers and assigns each pair a 3D-Jury score, based on structural similarity. To improve accuracy of the final model, users can select the prediction servers from which to aggregate results. The authors of 3D-Jury designed the system as a meta-predictor because earlier results concluded that the average low-energy protein conformation (by way of aggregation) fit the true conformation better than simply the lowest-energy protein conformation.

The Robetta automatic protein structure prediction server incorporates 3D-Jury into its prediction pipeline.

As of January 2024, the links to 3D-Jury originally hosted by the BioInfoBank Institute are no longer valid.

== Algorithm ==
First, pairwise comparisons are made between every combination of models generated from chosen protein prediction servers. Each comparison is then scored using the MaxSub tool. The score, $sim( M_{a,b}, M_{i,j} )$, is generated by counting the number of C_{α} atoms in the two predictions within 3.5 Å of each other after being superpositioned.

To get a roughly 90% chance two models are of a similar fold class, the authors set a threshold of 40 as the lowest score possible for a pair of models to be annotated as "similar". The authors admittedly chose this threshold based on unpublished work.

There are two scores 3D-Jury gives: the best-model-mode score using one model from each server ($3D-Jury-single(M_{a,b})$) and the all-model-mode score that considers all models from each server ($3D-Jury-all(M_{a,b})$).

The best-model-mode score using one model per server, $3D-Jury-single(M_{a,b})$, is calculated as,

$3D-Jury-single (M_{a,b}) = \frac{ \sum^N_i \max^{N_i}_{j,a \ne i \mbox{ OR } b \ne j} (sim(M_{a,b}, M_{i,j})) }{ 1 + N }$

where $N$ is the number of servers and $N_i$ is the number of top ranking models (with a maximum of 10) from the server $i$, while a pairwise similarity score is calculated between models $M_{a,b}$ (model $b$ from server $a$) and $M_{i,j}$ (model $j$ from server $i$).

While the all-model-mode score considering all models from the servers, $3D-Jury-all(M_{a,b})$, is calculated as,

$3D-Jury-all(M_{a,b}) = \frac{ \sum^N_i \sum^{N_i}_{j,a \ne i \mbox{ OR } b \ne j} sim(M_{a,b}, M_{i,j}) }{ 1 + \sum^N_i N_i }$

using similar variables as noted with the best-model-mode score.

Note, these meta-predictor scores do not take into account the confidence scores from each of the models from other servers.

== See also ==
- Protein structure prediction
- Comparison of software for molecular mechanics modeling
- List of protein structure prediction software
