= NL-201 =

Immunotherapy drug candidate

NL-201 was an immunotherapy drug candidate that underwent a Phase 1 human clinical trial in cancer patients. It is a de novo protein that was first computationally designed at the Institute of Protein Design (IPD), University of Washington. In November 2022, Neoleukin Therapeutics announced it would discontinue the development of NL-201.

== History ==
The predecessor of NL-201, neoleukin-2/15, was first described and published on Nature magazine in January 2019. The citizen science distributed computing project Rosetta@home, based at the University of Washington, contributed with "forward folding" experiments that helped validate protein designs of neoleukin-2/15, from which NL-201 was further developed by Neoleukin Therapeutics, a biopharmaceutical company that originated at the IPD.

The Phase 1 human clinical trial began on May 5, 2021.

In January 2022, Neoleukin Therapeutics announced a collaboration with Merck for a combination clinical trial of Merck's Pembrolizumab and Neoleukin's NL-201.

In November 2022, Neoleukin Therapeutics announced it would discontinue the development of NL-201.
