= SchedMD =

American Software Company

SchedMD LLC
- Type: Private
- Industry: High performance computing
- Founder: Morris Jette; Danny Auble
- Headquarters: Lehi, Utah, U.S.
- Area served: Worldwide
- Products: Slurm
- Parent: Nvidia
- Website: www.schedmd.com

SchedMD LLC is an American software company that is the main developer of the Slurm Workload Manager (or Slurm), an open-source workload management system. SchedMD also provides support, training and consulting services around Slurm.

SchedMD was founded in 2010, specifically to develop and provide services around Slurm. Its corporate headquarters are in Lehi, Utah.

In December 2025, it was announced that SchedMD had been acquired by Nvidia. Following the acquisition, Slurm continued to be developed and distributed as open-source, vendor-neutral software within Nvidia’s AI and high-performance computing software ecosystem.

== History ==
Slurm began development as a collaborative effort primarily by Lawrence Livermore National Laboratory, Linux NetworX, Hewlett-Packard and Groupe Bull as a Free Software resource manager in 2001. In 2010 Morris Jette and Danny Auble incorporated SchedMD LLC, to develop and market Slurm.

SchedMD provides services to many national labs, universities, corporations and government agencies, including:

- Arizona State University
- Brigham Young University
- Groupe Bull
- French CEA
- Cray
- Duke University
- Harvard University
- Lawrence Livermore National Laboratory
- Météo-France
- MIT
- NASA Center for Climate Simulation
- Swiss National Supercomputing Centre
- Tufts University

== Business model ==
SchedMD partly operates on a professional open-source business model based on open source code, development within a community, professional quality assurance, and subscription-based customer support.

SchedMD sells subscriptions for support, training and integration services. Customers pay a fixed price for unlimited access to services.
