= Critical Assessment of Prediction of Interactions =

Protein-protein docking structure prediction experiment

Critical Assessment of PRediction of Interactions (CAPRI) is a community-wide experiment in modelling the molecular structure of protein complexes, otherwise known as protein–protein docking.

The CAPRI is an ongoing series of events in which researchers throughout the community attempt to dock the same proteins, as provided by the assessors. Rounds take place about every six months. Each round contains between one and six target protein–protein complexes whose structures have been recently determined experimentally. The coordinates and are held privately by the assessors, with the co-operation of the structural biologists who determined them. The CAPRI experiment is double-blind, in the sense that the submitters do not know the solved structure, and the assessors do not know the correspondence between a submission and the identity of its creator.

== See also ==
- Critical Assessment of Techniques for Protein Structure Prediction (CASP) — a similar exercise in the field of protein structure prediction
- Critical Assessment of Functional Annotation (CAFA)
