= Oracle Grid Engine =

Batch-queuing system for computer clusters

- Developer: Oracle Corporation (formerly Sun Microsystems) in association with the community
- Stable release: 6.2u8; see the information on forks in the first section for sources for recent versions of the technology / October 1, 2012
- Operating system: Cross-platform
- Type: Grid computing
- License: SISSL
- Website: www.oracle.com/technetwork/oem/grid-engine-166852.html

Oracle Grid Engine was a grid computing and cluster resource-management software system developed by Sun Microsystems and later Oracle Corporation. Sun acquired Gridware in 2000, renamed its software Sun Grid Engine, and released the source code in 2001. After Oracle acquired Sun, changes to the distribution of the Grid Engine source code in 2010 led the community to create the Open Grid Scheduler project.

In 2011, Univa began developing its own fork, Univa Grid Engine, and in 2013 acquired the Grid Engine intellectual property and trademarks and took over support for Oracle Grid Engine customers. Univa was acquired by Altair Engineering in 2020. In 2023, former Grid Engine developers began developing Gridware Cluster Scheduler from the open-source Open Cluster Scheduler.

A typical Grid Engine cluster consists of a master host and one or more execution hosts. It can also use shadow masters that take over if the main master host fails.

== History ==
In 2000, Sun acquired Gridware, a privately owned commercial vendor of advanced computing resource management software with offices in San Jose, Calif., and Regensburg, Germany. Gridware's products included CODINE (Computing in Distributed Networked Environments) and Global Resource Director (GRD), predecessors of Sun Grid Engine. Later that year, Sun offered a free version of Gridware for Solaris and Linux, and renamed the product Sun Grid Engine.

In 2001, Sun made the source code available, and adopted the open source development model. Ports for Mac OS X and *BSD were contributed by the non-Sun open source developers.

In March 2006, Sun launched Internet access to its Sun Grid Compute Utility in the United States. The service ran Sun N1 Grid Engine 6 to manage jobs on its compute grid.

In 2010, after the purchase of Sun by Oracle, the Grid Engine 6.2 update 6 source code was not included with the binaries, and changes were not put back to the project's source repository. In response to this, the Grid Engine community started the Open Grid Scheduler project to continue to develop and maintain a free implementation of Grid Engine.

On January 18, 2011, it was announced that Univa had recruited several principal engineers from the former Sun Grid Engine team and that Univa would be developing their own forked version of Grid Engine. The newly announced Univa Grid Engine did include commercial support and would compete with the official version of Oracle Grid Engine.

On October 22, 2013, Univa has announced that it had acquired the intellectual property and trademarks pertaining to the Grid Engine technology and that Univa will take over support for Oracle Grid Engine customers.

In June 2018, Univa demonstrated a single Univa Grid Engine cluster using 1,015,022 cores on Amazon Web Services (AWS).

In September 2020, Altair Engineering, a global technology company providing solutions in data analytics, product development, and high-performance computing (HPC) acquired Univa.

2023 the lead developers of Sun Grid Engine, Oracle Grid Engine, Univa Grid Engine and successor decided to build Gridware Cluster Scheduler(GCS) based on their open source Open Cluster Scheduler which is 100% "SGE" backward compatible.

== Cluster architecture ==
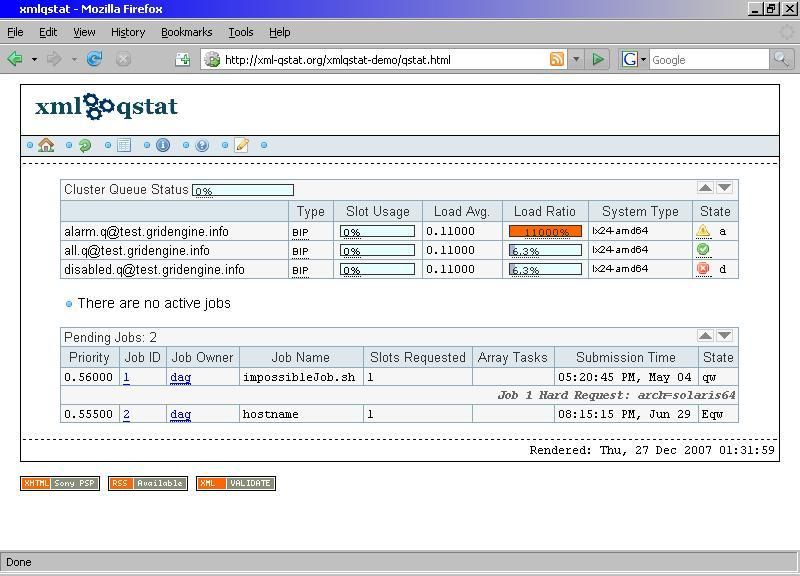
A screenshot of the xml-qstat web interface in 2007

A typical Grid Engine cluster consists of a master host and one or more execution hosts. Multiple shadow masters can also be configured as hot spares, which take over the role of the master when the original master host crashes.

== Support and training ==
Univa is providing commercial support and training for Univa Grid Engine and Oracle Grid Engine. Below is a description of some of the historic options.

Sun provided support contracts for the commercial version of Grid Engine on most UNIX platforms and Windows. Professional services, consulting, training, and support were provided by Sun Partners. Sun partners with Georgetown University to deliver Grid Engine administration classes. The Bioteam runs short SGE training workshops that are 1 or 2 days long.

Users obtained community support on the Grid Engine mailing lists. Grid Engine Workshops were held in 2002, 2003, 2007, 2009, and 2012 in Regensburg, Germany.

== Other Grid Engine based products ==
The below contains historic information and some of the products and solutions are no longer available:

- Sun Constellation System
- Sun Visualization System
- Sun Compute Cluster
- ClusterVisionOS Distribution
- Rocks Cluster Distribution
- Univa's UniCluster Express
- Univa Grid Engine
- Some Grid Engine – active free fork of SGE with "some" further modifications, Michigan Neuroscience Institute, University of Michigan (2021).
- Son of Grid Engine – inactive free fork of SGE with some enhancements, University of Liverpool, default Ubuntu/CentOS/RHEL gridengine package (2021).
- Open Cluster Scheduler – active free fork based on the Univa Open Core Grid Engine, which in turn is based on the open source Sun Grid Engine (2025).
- BioTeam's iNquiry
- Nimbus – uses Grid Engine as a virtual machine scheduler in a cloud computing environment

== See also ==
- Sun Ops Center - Sun's datacenter automation tool
- Open Grid Forum
