= World Community Grid =

BOINC based volunteer computing project to aid scientific research

- Developer(s): United Devices; IBM; Krembil Research Institute
- Initial release: November 16, 2004
- Stable release: 7.16.19
- Development status: Active
- Operating system: • Microsoft Windows • Linux • macOS • Android • Raspberry Pi OS
- Platform: BOINC
- Type: Volunteer computing
- Average performance: 402 TFLOPS
- Active users: 23,248
- Total users: 79,354
- Active hosts: 57,672
- Total hosts: 5,517,865
- Website: www.worldcommunitygrid.org or try https://www.cs.toronto.edu/~juris/jlab/wcg.html

World Community Grid (WCG) is an effort to create the world's largest volunteer computing platform to perform scientific research that benefits humanity. Launched on November 16, 2004, with proprietary Grid MP client from United Devices and adding support for Berkeley Open Infrastructure for Network Computing (BOINC) in 2005, World Community Grid eventually discontinued the Grid MP client and consolidated on the BOINC platform in 2008. In September 2021, it was announced that IBM transferred ownership to the Krembil Research Institute of University Health Network in Toronto, Ontario.

World Community Grid uses unused processing power of consumer devices (PCs, Laptops, Android Smartphones, etc.) to analyse data created by the research groups that participate in the grid. WCG projects have analysed data related to the human genome, the human microbiome, HIV, dengue, muscular dystrophy, cancer, influenza, Ebola, Zika virus, virtual screening, rice crop yields, clean energy, water purification and COVID-19, among other research areas.

There are currently four active projects and 28 completed projects. Several of these projects have published peer-reviewed papers based on the analysis of the data generated by WCG. These include an OpenZika project paper on the discovery of a compound (FAM 3) that inhibits the NS3 Helicase protein of the Zika virus, thus reducing viral replication by up to 86%; a FightAIDS@home paper on the discovery of new vulnerabilities on the HIV-1 Capsid protein which may allow for a new drug target; and a FightAIDS@home paper on new computational drug discovery techniques for more refined and accurate results.

== History ==
In 2003, IBM and other research participants sponsored the Smallpox Research Grid Project to accelerate the discovery of a cure for smallpox. The smallpox study used a massive distributed computing grid to analyse compounds' effectiveness against smallpox. The project allowed scientists to screen 35 million potential drug molecules against several smallpox proteins to identify good candidates for developing into smallpox treatments. In the first 72 hours, 100,000 results were returned. By the end of the project, 44 strong treatment candidates had been identified. Based on the success of the Smallpox study, IBM announced the creation of World Community Grid on November 16, 2004, with the goal of creating a technical environment where other humanitarian research could be processed.

World Community Grid initially only supported Windows, using the proprietary Grid MP software from United Devices which powered the grid.org distributed computing projects. Demand for Linux support led to the addition in November 2005 of open source Berkeley Open Infrastructure for Network Computing (BOINC) software which powers projects such as SETI@home and Climateprediction. Mac OS and Linux support was added since the introduction of BOINC. In 2007, the World Community Grid migrated from Grid MP to BOINC for all of its supported platforms.

In September 2021, IBM announced that it had transferred ownership of the World Community Grid to the Krembil Research Institute.

=== Scale of the project ===
As of January 8, 2023, World Community Grid had over 23,000 active user accounts, with over 57,000 active devices. Over the course of the project, more than 2,000,000 cumulative years of computing time have been donated, and over 6,000,000,000 work units have been completed.

== Operation ==
The World Community Grid client software works in the background, showing itself as a small icon in the computer's system tray. When the BOINC client is used, as in this example, the icon is yellow and blue.

The client software's status window, displaying information about the work currently being done in the background. This particular computer is 95.6% complete with its current workunit. When it reaches 100%, it will start on a new workunit and the results of the previous workunit will be transmitted back to WCG.

The World Community Grid software uses the unused computing time of Internet-connected devices to perform research calculations. Users install WCG client software onto their devices. This software works in the background, using spare system resources to process work for WCG. When a piece of work or workunit is completed, the client software sends it back to WCG over the Internet and downloads a new workunit. To ensure accuracy, the WCG servers send out multiple copies of each workunit. Then, when the results are received, they are collected and validated against each other.

World Community Grid offers multiple humanitarian projects under a single umbrella. Users are included in a subset of projects by default, but may opt out of projects as they choose.

Even though WCG makes use of open source client software, the actual applications that perform the scientific calculations may not be. However, several of the science applications are available under a free license, although the source is not available directly from WCG.

=== Potential problems ===
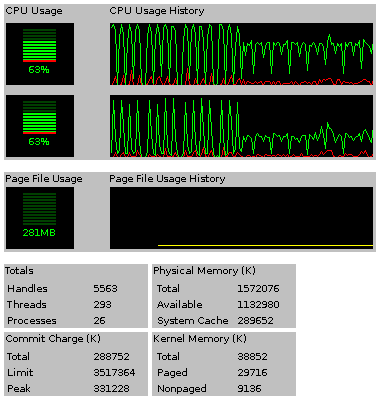
The picture shows particular two CPU usage history (under Hyper-threading) when BOINC client software is processing two tasks on each CPU under Microsoft Windows XP SP2. CPU usage history indicates almost 0% to 100% swing with peak to peak of 3 seconds interval, when view +update speed set to high, at first half recording period. The rest of half period of history is set to update speed normal, and upper CPU usage history indicates slightly more than 60% and lower CPU usage history show 35% approx. in average.

The World Community Grid software increases CPU usage by consuming unused processing time; in the late 1990s and early 2000s, such calculations were meant to reduce "wasted" CPU cycles. With modern CPUs, where dynamic frequency scaling is prevalent, increased usage makes the processor run at higher frequency, increasing power usage and heating counter to power management. Additionally, because of an increasing focus on power performance, or performance per watt, connecting old/inefficient computers to the grid will increase the total/average power required to complete the same calculations.

The BOINC client avoids slowing the computer by using a variety of limits that suspend computation when there are insufficient free resources. Unlike other BOINC projects, World Community Grid set the BOINC defaults conservatively, making the chances of computer damage extremely small. The default CPU throttle is 60%. The throttle is coarse-grained; for example, if usage is set to 60% it will work at 100% for 3 seconds, then at 0% for 2 seconds, resulting in an average decrease of processor use.

An add-on program for Windows computers – TThrottle – can solve the problem of overheating by directly limiting the BOINC project's use of the host computer. It does this by measuring the CPU and/or the GPU temperature and adjusts the run time accordingly. It also uses a shorter switching time of less than one second, resulting in less temperature change during switching.

== Statistics and competition ==
The contributions of each user are recorded and user contribution statistics are publicly available. Due to the fact that the processing time of each workunit varies from computer to computer, depending on the difficulty of the workunit, the speed of the computer, and the amount of idle resources available, contributions are usually measured in terms of points. Points are awarded for each workunit depending on the effort required to process it.

Upon completing a workunit, the BOINC client will request the number of points it thinks it deserves based on software benchmarks (see BOINC Credit System#Cobblestones). Since multiple computers process the same workunit to ensure accuracy, the World Community Grid servers can look at the points claimed by each of those computers. The WCG servers disregard statistical outliers, average the remaining values and award the resulting number of points to each computer.

Within the grid, users may join teams that have been created by organizations, groups, or individuals. Teams allow for a heightened sense of community identity and can also inspire competition. As teams compete against each other, more work is done for the grid overall.

== Outreach ==
World Community Grid recognizes companies and organizations as partners if they promote WCG within their company or organization. As of April 2021, WCG had 452 partners.

Also, as part of its commitment to improving human health and welfare, the results of all computations completed on World Community Grid are released into the public domain and made available to the scientific community.

== Scientific results ==
Since its launch, more than thirty projects have run in the World Community Grid. Some of the results include:

- In February 2014, the Help Fight Childhood Cancer project scientists announced the discovery of 7 compounds that destroy neuroblastoma cancer cells without any apparent side effects. This discovery, made with the support of the WCG volunteers, is a positive step towards a new treatment. The project has announced that it is seeking a collaboration with a pharmaceutical company in order to develop the compounds into treatments. Given the success of the project, the scientists have stated that they are already planning a follow-up project which will focus on other pediatric cancers, possibly in collaboration with a newly formed Pan-Asian oncology group, of which they are a founding member.
- As of July 2012, the Human Proteome Folding Project has published several papers using data from WCG. These include a paper on validation methods and a new database of protein structure and function predictions; a paper on the identification of proteins that regulate human processes; a paper on the analysis of the genomes from five plant families and their proteomes, for which WCG was used in the creation of over 29,000 protein structures; a paper on the proteome of Saccharomyces cerevisiae.
- The GO Fight Against Malaria project reported the discovery of several molecules that are effective against Malaria and Drug-Resistant Tuberculosis (including TDR-TB, for which there is no treatment available). The project also tested for new molecules against MRSA, Filariasis and Bubonic Plague. Laboratory testing continues in order to turn those molecules into possible treatments. GFAM was also the first project ever to perform a billion different docking calculations. A paper was published in January 2015, with two more pending submission. In June 2015, the project reported that of the two "hits" discovered against a drug-resistant tuberculosis strain, several "analogs" have been synthesized, the best one of which inhibits the growth of Mycobacterium tuberculosis and is relatively non-toxic to mammalian cells. Lack of funding prevented further research into the data.
- The Discovering Dengue Drugs - Together project scientists reported the discovery of several new Dengue protease inhibitors, most of which also inhibit the West Nile virus protease. A handful of these have already entered "crucial pre-clinical pharmacokinetic and efficacy studies". In November 2014, an update reported that the scientists have a drug lead that disables a key enzyme that allows the Dengue virus to replicate. It has also shown the same behaviour in other flaviviruses, such as the West Nile virus. No negative side effects such as toxicity, carcinogenicity or mutagenicity have been observed, making this drug lead a very strong antiviral drug candidate for these viruses. The scientists are now working to synthesize variants of the molecule to improve its activity and enter planned pre-clinical and clinical trials. However, in an October 2018 update, the research team reported that none of their current designs had produced a highly potent dengue protease inhibitor that could be tested in vivo.
- In June 2013, the Clean Energy Project published a database of over 2.3 million organic molecules which have had their properties characterized. Of these, 35,000 molecules have shown the potential to double the efficiency over organic solar cells currently being produced. Before this initiative, scientists knew of just a handful of carbon-based materials that were able to convert sunlight into electricity efficiently.
- In February 2010, the FightAIDS@Home project scientists announced that they have found two compounds which make a potentially new class of AIDS-fighting drugs possible. The compounds attach to the virus at newly discovered binding sites, and thus can be used to "enhance existing therapies, treat drug-resistant strains of the disease, and slow the evolution of drug resistance in the virus."
- In July 2015, the Drug Search for Leishmaniasis project announced it had tested the top 10 compounds with highest predicted efficiency out of over 100 identified via WCG workunits. Of those 10, 4 showed "positive results" in in vitro testing, with one showing "an exceptionally promising result". In August 2017, in vivo testing of the 4 compounds on hamsters showed favourable results, with one compound inducing "an almost complete curing of the lesions in two out of five hamsters." However, in a March 2018 update, the research team announced none of the 10 tested compounds had sufficient anti-leishmaniasis activity.
- In July 2015, the Computing for Clean Water project announced that a paper had been published in the Nature Nanotechnology journal describing a new type of water filter efficiently utilising nanotubes. "[The] nanotubes are made of single-atom-thick sheets of carbon atoms, called graphene, rolled up into tiny tubes, with diameters of just a few nanometers - one ten-thousandth the diameter of a human hair. The size of the tubes allows water molecules to pass through, but blocks larger pathogens and contaminants, purifying the water." By running simulations on WCG, the scientists discovered that certain kinds of natural vibrations called phonons, under specific conditions, can lead to more than 300% increased flow of water through the nanotubes, compared to previous theoretical predictions.
- In April 2015, the Say No To Schistosoma project scientists reported that subsequent analysis had been performed, and the three most promising candidate substances had been identified for in vitro testing.
- In March 2019, FightAIDS@Home researchers published a paper describing a "Novel Intersubunit Interaction Critical for HIV-1 Core Assembly" that "defines a Potentially Targetable Inhibitor Binding Pocket". Using World Community Grid, more than 1.6 million compounds were used to target 20 conformations of this pocket. Preliminary results suggest it to be a plausible binding site for antiviral compounds. Further analysis of these compounds are the subject of an independent study.

== Active subprojects ==
=== OpenPandemics - COVID-19 ===
On April 1, 2020, IBM announced OpenPandemics - COVID-19. The project aims to identify possible treatments for the Severe acute respiratory syndrome coronavirus 2 (SARS-CoV-2) which is responsible for the COVID-19 pandemic. WCG will partner with Scripps Research, with whom it has partnered in the past, notably in FightAIDS@Home projects. The project runs on CPUs and GPUs and will also serve to create a "fast-response, open source tool that will help all scientists quickly search for treatments for future pandemics."

The project launched on May 14, 2020.

=== Mapping Cancer Markers ===
Mapping Cancer Markers (launched November 8, 2013). The project aims to identify the markers associated with various types of cancer, and is analyzing millions of data points collected from thousands of healthy and cancerous patient tissue samples. These include tissues with lung, ovarian, prostate, pancreatic and breast cancers. By comparing these different data points, researchers aim to identify patterns of markers for different cancers and correlate them with different outcomes, including responsiveness to various treatment options. The project is focusing on 4 types of cancer, with the first focus being on lung cancer, and will move on to ovarian cancer, prostate cancer and sarcoma.

=== Africa Rainfall Project ===
The Africa Rainfall Project (launched October 2019) will use the computing power of World Community Grid, data from The Weather Company, and other data to improve rainfall modelling, which can help farmers in sub-Saharan Africa successfully raise their crops. The amount of RAM that can be involved in calculations is from 1 to 16 gigabytes.

== Completed subprojects ==
=== Human Proteome Folding – Phase 1 ===
The first project launched on World Community Grid was the Human Proteome Folding Project, or HPF1, which aims to predict the structure of human proteins. The project was launched on November 16, 2004, and completed on July 18, 2006. This project was unique in that computation was done in tandem with the grid.org distributed computing project. Devised by Richard Bonneau at the Institute for Systems Biology, the project used grid computing to produce the likely structures for each of the proteins using a Rosetta Score. From these predictions, researchers hope to predict the function of the myriad proteins. This increased understanding of the human proteins could prove vital in the search for cures to human diseases. Computing for this project was officially completed on July 18, 2006. Research results for the yeast portion of HPF1 have been published.

=== Human Proteome Folding – Phase 2 ===
Human Proteome Folding - Phase 2 (HPF2) (launched June 23, 2006) was the third project to run on World Community Grid, and completed in 2013. This project, following on from HPF1, focused on human-secreted proteins, with special focus on biomarkers and the proteins on the surface of cells as well as Plasmodium, the organism that causes malaria. HPF2 generates higher-resolution protein models than HPF1. Though these higher-resolution models are more useful, they also require more processing power to generate.

In a July 2012 status report, the project scientists reported that the results generated by the WCG calculations are being used by Dr. Markus Landthaler of the Max Delbruch Center for Molecular Medicine (MDC) in Berlin. The HPF2 results helped Dr. Markus Landthaler and his collaborators in writing up a new paper on "The mRNA-Bound Proteome and Its Global Occupancy Profile on Protein-Coding Transcripts"

=== Help Defeat Cancer ===
The Help Defeat Cancer project seeks to improve the ability of medical professionals to determine the best treatment options for patients with breast, head, or neck cancer. The project was launched on July 20, 2006, and completed in April 2007. The project worked by identifying visual patterns in large numbers of tissue microarrays taken from archived tissue samples. By correlating the pattern data with information about treatment and patient outcome, the results of this project could help provide better targeted treatment options.

=== Genome Comparison ===
The Genome Comparison project is sponsored by the Brazilian research institution Fiocruz. The project was launched on November 21, 2006, and completed on July 21, 2007. The project seeks to compare gene sequences of different organisms against each other in order to find similarities between them. Scientists hope to discover what purpose a particular gene sequence serves in a particular function of one organism, via comparing it to a similar gene sequence of known function in another organism.

=== Help Cure Muscular Dystrophy – Phase 1 ===
Help Cure Muscular Dystrophy is run by Décrypthon, a collaboration between French Muscular Dystrophy Association, French National Center for Scientific Research and IBM. Phase 1 was launched on December 19, 2006, and completed on June 11, 2007. The project investigated protein–protein interactions for 40,000 proteins whose structures are known, with particular focus on those proteins that play a role in neuromuscular diseases. The database of information produced will help researchers design molecules to inhibit or enhance binding of particular macromolecules, hopefully leading to better treatments for muscular dystrophy and other neuromuscular diseases. This project was available only to agents running the Grid MP client, making it unavailable to users running BOINC.

=== Discovering Dengue Drugs – Together ===
Discovering Dengue Drugs – Together was sponsored by scientists at the University of Texas and the University of Chicago and will run in two phases. Phase 1, launched August 21, 2007, used AutoDock 2007 (the same software used for FightAIDS@Home) to test potential antiviral drugs (through NS3 protease inhibition) against viruses from the family flaviviridae and completed on August 11, 2009. Phase 2 "[uses] a more computationally intensive program to screen the candidates that make it through Phase 1." The drug candidates that make it through Phase 2 will then be lab-tested.

=== AfricanClimate@Home ===
The mission of AfricanClimate@Home was to develop more accurate climate models of specific regions in Africa. It was intended to serve as a basis for understanding how the climate will change in the future so that measures designed to alleviate the adverse effects of climate change could be implemented. World Community Grid's tremendous computing power was used to understand and reduce the uncertainty with which climate processes were simulated over Africa. Phase 1 of African Climate@Home launched on September 3, 2007, and ended in July 2008.

=== Help Conquer Cancer ===
Help Conquer Cancer project (launched November 1, 2007) is sponsored by the Ontario Cancer Institute (OCI), Princess Margaret Hospital and University Health Network of Toronto, Canada. The project involves X-ray crystallography. The mission of Help Conquer Cancer is to improve the results of protein X-ray crystallography, which helps researchers not only annotate unknown parts of the human proteome, but importantly improves their understanding of cancer initiation, progression and treatment.

The HCC project was the first WCG project benefiting from graphics processing units (GPU)s which helped finish it a lot earlier than initially projected due to the massive power of GPUs. In the April 2013 status report the scientists report there is still a lot of data to analyze but that they are preparing a new project that will search for prognostic and predictive signatures (sets of genes, proteins, microRNAs, etc.) that help predict patient survival and response to treatment. The project finished in May 2013.

=== Nutritious Rice for the World ===
The Nutritious Rice for the World project is carried out by Ram Samudrala's Computational Biology Research Group at the University of Washington. The project was launched on May 12, 2008, and completed on April 6, 2010. The purpose of this project is to predict the structure of proteins of major strains of rice, in order to help farmers breed better rice strains with higher crop yields, promote greater disease and pest resistance, and utilize a full range of bioavailable nutrients that can benefit people around the world, especially in regions where malnutrition is a critical concern. The project has been covered by more than 200 media outlets since its inception. On April 13, 2010, World Community Grid officially announced that the Nutritious Rice for the World project finished on April 6, 2010.

In April 2014, an update was posted stating that the research team was able to publish structural information about thousands of proteins, and advance the field of computational protein modeling. These results – which were only possible because of the massive amount of donated computing power they had available – are expected to guide future research and plant science efforts.

=== The Clean Energy Project ===
The Clean Energy project is sponsored by the scientists of Harvard University's Department of Chemistry and Chemical Biology. The mission of the Clean Energy Project is to find new materials for the next generation of solar cells and later, energy storage devices. Researchers are employing molecular mechanics and electronic structure calculations to predict the optical and transport properties of molecules that could become the next generation of solar cell materials.

Phase 1 was launched on December 5, 2008, and completed on October 13, 2009. By harnessing the computing power of the World Community Grid, researchers were able to calculate the electronic properties of tens of thousands of organic materials – many more than could ever be tested in a lab – and determine which candidates are most promising for developing affordable solar energy technology.

Phase 2 was launched June 28, 2010, sponsored by the scientists of Harvard University's Department of Chemistry and Chemical Biology. Further calculations about optical, electronic and other physical properties of the candidate materials are being conducted with the Q-Chem quantum chemistry software. Their findings have been submitted to the Energy & Environmental Science journal.

=== Help Fight Childhood Cancer ===
Help Fight Childhood Cancer project (launched March 13, 2009) is sponsored by the scientists at Chiba Cancer Center Research Institute and Chiba University. The mission of the Help Fight Childhood Cancer project is to find drugs that can disable three particular proteins associated with neuroblastoma, one of the most frequently occurring solid tumors in children. Identifying these drugs could potentially make the disease much more curable when combined with chemotherapy treatment.

=== Influenza Antiviral Drug Search ===
Influenza Antiviral Drug Search project is sponsored by Dr. Stan Watowich and his research team at The University of Texas Medical Branch (Galveston, Texas, USA). The project was launched on May 5, 2009, and completed on October 22, 2009. The mission of the Influenza Antiviral Drug Search project is to find new drugs that can stop the spread of an influenza infection in the body. The research will specifically address the influenza strains that have become drug resistant as well as new strains that are appearing. Identifying the chemical compounds that are the best candidates will accelerate the efforts to develop treatments that would be useful in managing seasonal influenza outbreaks, and future influenza epidemics and even pandemics. Phase 1 of The Influenza Antiviral Drug Search project has already finished on October 22, 2009. Now the researchers are performing post-processing on the results from Phase 1 and are preparing for Phase 2.

In November 2012, the project's scientists stated that, given the fact that there is no immediate danger of an influenza outbreak, all of the project's results would be posted online and their resources would be refocused on the Dengue Project.

=== Help Cure Muscular Dystrophy – Phase 2 ===
World Community Grid and researchers supported by Decrypthon, a partnership between AFM (French Muscular Dystrophy Association), CNRS (French National Center for Scientific Research), Universite Pierre et Marie Curie, and IBM were investigating protein–protein interactions for more than 2,200 proteins whose structures are known, with particular focus on those proteins that play a role in neuromuscular diseases. Phase 2 was launched on May 12, 2009, and completed on September 26, 2012. The database of information produced will help researchers design molecules to inhibit or enhance binding of particular macromolecules, hopefully leading to better treatments for muscular dystrophy and other neuromuscular diseases.

Phase 2 of the Help Cure Muscular Dystrophy project began once the results from the first phase had been analyzed. Phase 2 ran on the BOINC platform.

=== Discovering Dengue Drugs – Together – Phase 2 ===
Discovering Dengue Drugs – Together – Phase 2 (launched February 17, 2010) is sponsored by The University of Texas Medical Branch (UTMB) in Galveston, Texas, United States and the University of Chicago in Illinois, USA. The mission is to identify promising drug candidates to combat the Dengue, Hepatitis C, West Nile, Yellow Fever, and other related viruses. The extensive computing power of World Community Grid will be used to complete the structure-based drug discovery calculations required to identify these drug candidates.

=== Computing for Clean Water ===
Computing for Clean Water (launched September 20, 2010) is sponsored by the Center for Nano and Micro Mechanics of Tsinghua University in Beijing. The project's mission is to provide deeper insight on the molecular scale into the origins of the efficient flow of water through a novel class of filter materials. This insight will in turn guide future development of low-cost and more efficient water filters. It is estimated that 1.2 billion people lack access to safe drinking water, and 2.6 billion have little or no sanitation. As a result, millions of people die annually – an estimated 3,900 children a day due to a lack of clean water. On April 25, 2014, the project scientists released an update stating that they had exciting results to report when the paper is submitted and that the project on WCG was finished.

=== Drug Search for Leishmaniasis ===
Drug Search for Leishmaniasis (launched September 7, 2011) is spearheaded by the University of Antioquia in Medellín, Colombia, with assistance from researchers at the University of Texas Medical Branch in Galveston, Texas. The mission is to identify potential molecule candidates that could possibly be developed into treatments for Leishmaniasis. The extensive computing power of World Community Grid will be used to perform computer simulations of the interactions between millions of chemical compounds and certain target proteins. This will help find the most promising compounds that may lead to effective treatments for the disease.

=== GO Fight Against Malaria Project ===
The mission of the GO Fight Against Malaria project (launched November 16, 2011) is to discover promising drug candidates that could be developed into new drugs that cure drug resistant forms of malaria. The computing power of World Community Grid will be used to perform computer simulations of the interactions between millions of chemical compounds and certain target proteins, to predict their ability to eliminate malaria. The best compounds will be tested by scientists at The Scripps Research Institute in La Jolla, California, U.S.A. and further developed into possible treatments for the disease.

=== Say No to Schistosoma ===
Say No to Schistosoma (launched February 22, 2012) was the 20th research project to be launched on World Community Grid. The researchers at Infórium University in Belo Horizonte and FIOCRUZ-Minas, Brazil, ran this project on World Community Grid to perform computer simulations of the interactions between millions of chemical compounds and certain target proteins in the hope of finding effective treatments for schistosomiasis. As of April 2015, subsequent analysis had been performed, and three of the most promising candidate substances had been identified for in-vitro testing.

=== Computing for Sustainable Water ===
Computing for Sustainable Water was the 21st research project to be launched on World Community Grid. The researchers at the University of Virginia were running this project on World Community Grid to study the effects of human activity on a large watershed and gain deeper insights into what actions can support the restoration, health and sustainability of this important water resource. The project was launched on April 17, 2012, and completed on October 17, 2012.

=== Uncovering Genome Mysteries ===
The Uncovering Genome Mysteries project launched on October 16, 2014, and is a joint collaboration between Australian and Brazilian scientists. The project aims to examine close to 200 million genes from many life forms and compare them with known genes in order to find out what their function is. The results could have an effect in fields such as medicine and environmental research.

=== Outsmart Ebola Together ===
Outsmart Ebola Together was a collaboration with the Scripps Research Institute to help find chemical compounds to fight Ebola virus disease. It was launched on 3 December 2014. The aim is to block crucial steps in the life cycle of the virus, by finding drugs with high binding affinity with certain of its proteins. There are two targets: a surface protein used by the virus to infect human cells, and "transformer" proteins which change shape to carry out different functions. The project officially completed December 6, 2018.

=== OpenZika ===
OpenZika was launched on May 18, 2016, to help combat the Zika virus. The project targets proteins that are believed to be used by the Zika virus to survive and spread in the body, based on known results from similar diseases like dengue fever and yellow fever. These results will help researchers develop an anti-Zika drug. The project officially completed December 13, 2019.

=== FightAIDS@Home ===
FightAIDS@Home (launched November 19, 2005) was World Community Grid's second project and its first to target a single disease. Each individual computer processes one potential drug molecule and tests how well it would dock with HIV protease, acting as a protease inhibitor. Scripps Research Institute published its first peer-reviewed scientific paper about the results of FightAIDS@Home on April 21, 2007. This paper explains that the results up to that point will primarily be used to improve the efficiency of future FightAIDS@Home calculations.

=== FightAIDS@Home Phase 2 ===
FightAIDS@Home Phase 2 (launched September 30, 2015) is looking more closely at the results of Phase 1. The project has two goals in the early experiments; the simulation architecture is functioning correctly and giving reliable results, and using BEDAM and AutoDock together provides better results than using just BEDAM or AutoDock.

=== Microbiome Immunity Project ===
Microbiome Immunity Project (launched August 2017) is a study of proteins in bacteria located in and on the human body; the human microbiome, which comprises around 3 million separate bacterial genes. By studying bacterial genes, researchers can determine their individual shapes, which in turn dictate the function of the bacteria. Collaborative institutions includes the University of California San Diego, Broad Institute of MIT and Harvard, and the Simons Foundation's Flatiron Institute.

=== Help Stop TB ===
Help Stop TB was launched in March 2016 to help combat tuberculosis, a disease caused by a bacterium that is evolving resistance to currently available treatments. The computations of this project target mycolic acids in the bacterium's protective coat, simulating the behaviour of these molecules to better understand how they offer protection to the bacteria.

=== Smash Childhood Cancer ===
Launched in January 2017, the Smash Childhood Cancer project builds on the work from the Help Fight Childhood Cancer project by looking for drug candidates targeting additional childhood cancers. Upon Dr. Akira Nakagawara's retirement in March 2020, the principal investigator changed to Dr. Godfrey Chan, who was one of the original members of the Smash Childhood Cancer team. Additionally, PRDM14 and Fox01 have been added as new targets for investigation. An inhibitor of the osteopontin protein was modeled.

== See also ==
- BOINC
- Folding@home
- List of volunteer computing projects
- World community
