= Univa =

Software company

Univa, An Altair Company
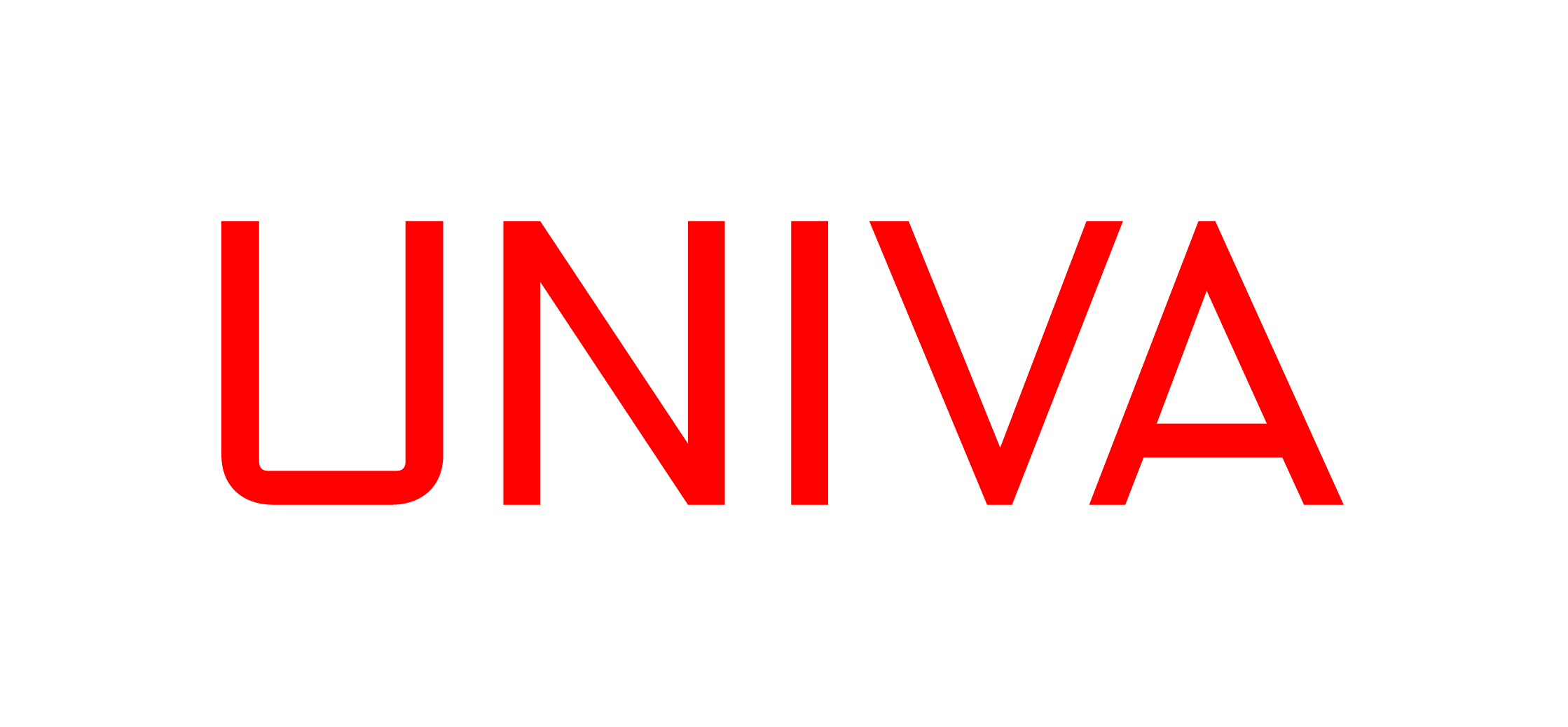
- Industry: Cloud computing, Distributed computing, Grid computing, Computer software
- Founded: Lisle, Illinois (2004)
- Headquarters: Troy, Michigan, United States
- Products: Univa Grid Engine, License Orchestrator, and Navops Launch
- Website: www.altair.com

Univa was a software company that developed workload management and cloud management products for compute-intensive applications in the data center and across public, private, and hybrid clouds, before being acquired by Altair Engineering in September 2020.

Univa software manages diverse application workloads and resources, helping enterprises scale and automate infrastructure to maximize efficiency and throughput while also helping them manage cloud spending.

Univa’s primary market was High Performance Computing (HPC). Its products were used in a variety of industries, including manufacturing, life sciences, energy, government labs and universities. Univa software was used to manage large-scale HPC, analytic, and machine learning applications across these industries.

== Products and services ==
Univa developed, sold, and supported Univa Grid Engine software, Univa's version of the popular Grid Engine workload manager. Univa also offered Navops Launch, a solution providing cloud migration, cloud automation, and cloud spend management for users of Univa Grid Engine.

Univa announced in January 2011 that it hired personnel formerly working for Oracle and Sun Microsystems on Grid Engine development. On April 12, 2011, Univa rolled out its initial commercial release of Univa Grid Engine based on open source Grid Engine. The commercial released offered new functionality related to performance, and resource control for small and large clusters and provided enterprise customers with support services.

On October 22, 2013 Univa announced it acquired the intellectual property, copyrights and trademarks pertaining to the Grid Engine technology from Oracle and that it would support Oracle Grid Engine customers.

Univa announced Navops in May 2016, a new business unit with products enabling enterprises to easily migrate to the cloud or deploy hybrid clouds. Among the public clouds supported by Navops Launch are Amazon Web Services (AWS), Google Cloud Platform, and Microsoft Azure.

Navops Launch provides cloud automation features to dynamically configure cloud-based Univa Grid Engine clusters and scale them based on application workloads and configurable policies. Navops Launch also provides cloud spend management features to help organizations monitor and manage cloud spending by extracting information from cloud-specific APIs. Organizations can use Navops Launch to manage spending by project, group, department, and cost-center.

Univa enhanced both Univa Grid Engine and Navops Launch, supporting new operating environments, machine architectures, and cloud providers. Key areas of focus for both Univa Grid Engine and Navops Launch have been around performance and scalability. Both were demonstrated by a well-publicized one million core cluster deployment in AWS announced in June 2018. Other areas of focus have been around managing containerized and GPU-aware application workloads.

Univa offered support services, education services, and consulting services related to installation, tuning, and configuration for all of its products.

== History ==
Univa was founded in 2004 under the name Univa Corporation by Carl Kesselman, Ian Foster, and Steve Tuecke and was at that time primarily known for providing open source products and technical support based around the Globus Toolkit.

On September 17, 2007, the company announced that it would merge with the Austin, Texas-based United Devices and operate under the new name Univa UD.

The company operated as Univa UD until formally dropping "UD" and returning to common use of Univa Corporation. Univa announced, on January 17, 2011, that it had hired the principal and founding engineers of the Grid Engine team.

On Oct 22, 2013 Univa announced that it had acquired the intellectual property as well the copyrights and trademarks pertaining to the Grid Engine technology from Oracle and trademarks pertaining to the Grid Engine technology from Oracle and that it will take over supporting Oracle Grid Engine customers.

In June 2014, a technical partnership between Sahara Force India Formula One Team and Univa was announced.

In May 2016, Univa announced a new business unit, Navops with a product line based on its Grid Engine cluster workload scheduling technology previously developed at Sun Microsystems and later acquired by Univa from Oracle. Navops Launch enables enterprises to migrate workloads to cloud or hybrid cloud environments.

In March 2018 Univa open-sources Navops Launch (née Unicloud) as Project Tortuga under an Apache 2.0 license.

In September 2019, Univa announced enhancements to Navops Launch in a 2.0 release, including an enhanced UI, improved automation, and spend management features.

In September 2020, Altair Engineering, a global technology company providing solutions in data analytics, product development, and high-performance computing (HPC) acquired Univa.

== See also ==
- Computational grid
- grid.org
- Job schedulers
- High-performance computing
- Supercomputing
- Big data
- Distributed computing
- Grid computing
- CPU scavenging
- Cloud computing
