= FightAIDS@Home =

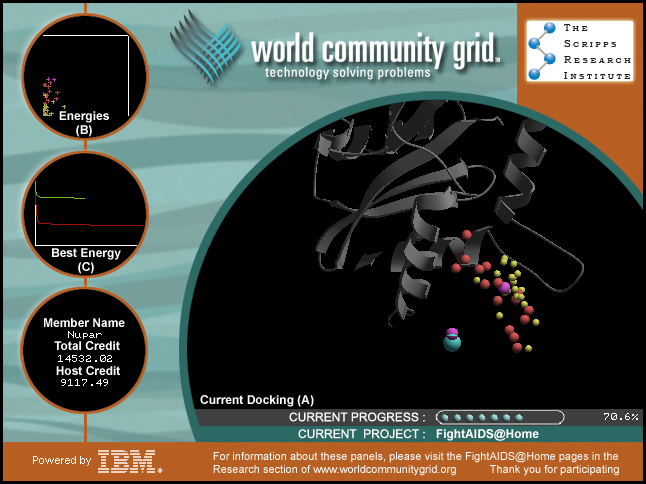
FightAIDS@Home screensaver

FightAIDS@Home is a volunteer computing project operated by the Olson Laboratory at The Scripps Research Institute. It runs on internet-connected home computers, and since July 2013 also runs on Android smartphones and tablets. It aims to use biomedical software simulation techniques to search for ways to cure or prevent the spread of HIV/AIDS.

== Methods ==
Olson's target is HIV protease, a key molecular machine of the virus that when blocked stops it from maturing. These blockers, known as "protease inhibitors", are thus a way of avoiding the onset of AIDS and prolonging life. The Olson Laboratory is using computational methods to identify new candidate drugs that have the right shape and chemical characteristics to block HIV protease. This general approach is called structure-based drug design, and according to the National Institutes of Health's National Institute of General Medical Sciences, it has already had a dramatic effect on the lives of people living with AIDS.

FightAIDS@Home makes use of the AutoDock VINA software, which tests how well a particular molecule binds to the HIV-1 protease.

In October 2015 FightAIDS@Home Phase 2 was launched, using the computationally intensive Binding Energy Distribution Analysis Method (BEDAM) to "more thoroughly evaluate the top candidates from the vast number of results generated in Phase 1".

== History ==
It was originally implemented using a distributed computing software infrastructure provided by Entropia. However, since May 2003 FightAIDS@Home has not been associated with Entropia, and on November 21, 2005, the project moved to World Community Grid and the Entropia software was abandoned.

Scripps Research Institute published its first peer-reviewed scientific paper about the results of FightAIDS@Home on April 21, 2007. This paper explains that the results up to that point will primarily be used to improve the efficiency of future FightAIDS@Home calculations.

On February 3, 2010, the project announced it found two compounds that make a completely new class of AIDS-fighting drugs possible: "two compounds that act on novel binding sites for an enzyme used by the human immunodeficiency virus (HIV), the virus that causes AIDS. The discovery lays the foundation for the development of a new class of anti-HIV drugs to enhance existing therapies, treat drug-resistant strains of the disease, and slow the evolution of drug resistance in the virus."

A March 2022 research paper details the results of the screening of over 1.6 million ZINC compounds at World Community Grid. First screened using AutoDock Vina, the top-scoring 500 were then analysed using BEDAM. After further screening, 24 of these were selected to perform thermal shift assays. 2 compounds appear to bind at the HIV-1 Capsid dimmer interface, possibly by occupying a new sub-pocket that has not been exploited by any existing HIV-1 capsid inhibitors.

== System requirements ==
The minimum system requirements to run FightAIDS@home are:

Memory	250 MB
Hard drive	50 MB
Computer graphics	optional
Internet connection	

With distributed computing every computer added accelerates the project, while the program has little impact on the performance of the machine where it is installed, as the calculation process can be set to run at minimum priority in the background.

== Publications ==
- Chang, Max W.; Lindstrom, William; Olson, Arthur J.; Belew, Richard K. (2007). "Analysis of HIV Wild-Type and Mutant Structures via in Silico Docking against Diverse Ligand Libraries" (PDF). J. Chem. Inf. Model. 47 (3): 1258–1262. doi:10.1021/ci700044s. PMID 17447753.
- Perryman, A.; Santiago, D.; Forli, S.; Santos-Martins, D.; Olson, A. (2014), "Virtual screening with AutoDock Vina and the common pharmacophore engine of a low diversity library of fragments and hits against the three allosteric sites of HIV integrase: participation in the SAMPL4 protein–ligand binding challenge", Journal of Computer-Aided Molecular Design, 28 (4): 429–441, Bibcode:2014JCAMD..28..429P, doi:10.1007/s10822-014-9709-3, PMC 4053500, PMID 24493410

== See also ==
- List of volunteer computing projects
