= Grid.org =

grid.org was a website and online community established in 2001 for cluster computing and grid computing software users. For six years it operated several different volunteer computing projects that allowed members to donate their spare computer cycles to worthwhile causes. In 2007, it became a community for open source cluster and grid computing software. After around 2010 it redirected to other sites.

== Volunteer computing projects ==
From its establishment in April 2001 until April 27, 2007, grid.org was the website and organization that ran distributed computing projects such as the United Devices Cancer Research Project, led by Jikku Venkat, Ph.D. and was sponsored philanthropically by United Devices (UD) and members participated in volunteer computing by running the UD Agent software (version 3.0).

Timeline of projects hosted by grid.org

=== Cancer Research Project ===
UD Agent running the LigandFit software for Cancer Research phase 2.

The United Devices Cancer Research Project, which began in 2001, was seeking possible drugs for the treatment of cancer using distributed computing. There were around 150,000 users in the United States and 170,000 in Europe along with hundreds of thousands more in other parts of the world.

The project was an alliance of several companies and organisations:

- United Devices Inc.
- National Foundation for Cancer Research
- University of Oxford Department of Chemistry
- Donors of molecular research

United Devices released the cancer research screensaver under the principle of using spare computing power. The program, which could be set to run continually, used "virtual screening" to find possible interactions between molecules and target proteins, i.e. a drug. These molecules (ligands) are sent to the host computer's UD Agent. When these molecules dock successfully with a target protein this interaction is scored for further investigation.

The research consisted of two phases:

- Phase 1 tested over 3 billion drug-like molecules against 12 proteins which were known to be suitable targets for anti-cancer drugs. It used the "THINK" software for the simulation of the molecular interactions.
- Phase 2, using the "LigandFit" software developed by Accelrys to model interactions, sought to refine the Phase 1 data to produce a more manageable list of drug candidates for testing that would require experimental collaborators, including some from industry.

=== Human Proteome Folding Project, phase 1 ===
The IBM-sponsored Human Proteome Folding Project ("HPF"), phase 1, was announced on November 16, 2004, and was completed July 3, 2006. The project operated simultaneously on both grid.org and the IBM's World Community Grid.

It made use of the "Rosetta" software to predict the structure of human proteins in order to help predict the function of proteins. This information may someday be used to help cure a variety of diseases and genetic defects.

According to an announcement on the grid.org forums, after the HPF1 project was completed it was left to continue running on grid.org until August 9, 2006. During that time, members whose computers were configured to run this project got new work and spent computing resources calculating a result, but the result was returned to grid.org for points only—it was not used for scientific research.

The status of the Human Proteome Folding Project caused some discussion on the grid.org forums. Most members wanted to see all available computing power directed toward the still-active cancer project, but UD representative Robby Brewer asserted that "some [users] like the screensaver". As noted above, in the end the redundant HPF1 work on grid.org was halted.

=== Smallpox Project ===
The Smallpox Research Grid was a part of United Devices "Patriot Grid" initiative to fight biological terrorism. This project helped analyze potential drug candidates for a medical therapy in the fight against smallpox virus. It made use of the "LigandFit" software (that had already been used by phase 2 of the Cancer Research project), but with a specialized set of target molecules that targeted the smallpox virus.

The partners of the project included University of Oxford, the University of Western Ontario, Memorial Sloan–Kettering Cancer Center, Essex University, Evotec OAI, Accelrys, and IBM.

The World Community Grid largely began because of the success of this project.

=== Anthrax Project ===
The Anthrax Research Project was a part of the United Devices "Patriot Grid" initiative to fight biological terrorism. It made use of the "LigandFit" software (that had already been used by phase 2 of the Cancer Research project), but with a specialized set of target molecules that targeted the advanced stages of anthrax bacterial infection.

The project was operated from January 22, 2002, until February 14, 2002, and ended after a total of 3.57 billion molecules had finished screening. The results of the research project were transmitted to biological scientists in order to finish the screening of the computational simulations.

The partners of the project included Oxford University.

=== HMMER Project ===
The HMMER Genetic Research project made use of the Hidden Markov model to search for patterns in genetic DNA sequences.

=== Webload Project ===
The Web Performance Testing project was operated as a commercial opportunity with select web hosting providers in order to help them test the scalability of their server infrastructures under periods of high-demand.

== Open source grid community ==
In November 2007, grid.org was repositioned by Univa as a community to allow users to interact and discuss open source cluster and grid related topics. It allowed users to download, get support for, contribute to, and report issues about the open source Globus Toolkit based products offered by Univa. Over 100,000 unique visitors were reported in 2008. Around mid 2010 it redirected to Unicluster.org (a Univa product) and by 2012 it redirected to Univa's main site.

== See also ==
- List of volunteer computing projects
