= Volunteer computing =

System where users donate computer resources to contribute to research

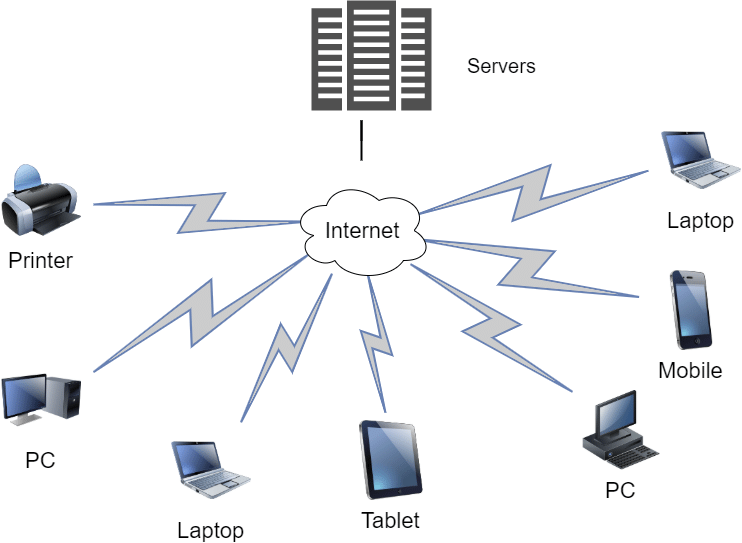
A program running on a volunteer's computer periodically contacts a research application server via the Internet to request jobs and report results.

Volunteer computing is a type of distributed computing in which people donate their computers' unused resources to a research-oriented project, sometimes in exchange for credit points. The fundamental idea behind it is that a modern desktop computer is sufficiently powerful to perform billions of operations a second, but for most users only between 10–15% of its capacity is used. Common tasks such as word processing or web browsing leave the computer mostly idle.

The practice of volunteer computing, which dates back to the mid-1990s, can potentially make substantial processing power available to researchers at minimal cost. Typically, a program running on a volunteer's computer periodically contacts a research application to request jobs and report results. A middleware system usually serves as an intermediary.

== History ==
The first volunteer computing project was the Great Internet Mersenne Prime Search, which started in January 1996. It was followed in 1997 by distributed.net. In 1997 and 1998, several academic research projects developed Java-based systems for volunteer computing; examples include Bayanihan, Popcorn, Superweb, and Charlotte.

The term volunteer computing was coined by Luis F. G. Sarmenta, the developer of Bayanihan. It is also appealing for global efforts on social responsibility, or Corporate Social Responsibility as reported in a Harvard Business Review.

In 1999, the SETI@home and Folding@home projects were launched. These projects received considerable media coverage, and each one attracted several hundred thousand volunteers.

Between 1998 and 2002, several companies were formed with business models involving volunteer computing. Examples include Popular Power, Porivo, Entropia, and United Devices.

In 2002, the Berkeley Open Infrastructure for Network Computing (BOINC) project was founded at University of California, Berkeley Space Sciences Laboratory, funded by the National Science Foundation. BOINC provides a complete middleware system for volunteer computing, including a client, client GUI, application runtime system, server software, and software implementing a project web site. The first project based on BOINC was Predictor@home, based at the Scripps Research Institute, which began operation in 2004. Soon thereafter, SETI@home and climateprediction.net began using BOINC. A number of new BOINC-based projects were created over the next few years, including Rosetta@home, Einstein@home, and AQUA@home. In 2007, IBM World Community Grid switched from the United Devices platform to BOINC.

== Middleware ==
The client software of the early volunteer computing projects consisted of a single program that combined the scientific computation and the distributed computing infrastructure. This monolithic architecture was inflexible. For example, it was difficult to deploy new application versions.

More recently, volunteer computing has moved to middleware systems that provide a distributed computing infrastructure independent from the scientific computation. Examples include:

- BOINC is the most widely used middleware system. It offers client software for Windows, macOS, Linux, Android, and other Unix variants.
- XtremWeb is used primarily as a research tool. It is developed by a group based at the University of Paris-South.
- Xgrid is developed by Apple. Its client and server components run only on macOS.
- Grid MP is a commercial middleware platform developed by United Devices and was used in volunteer computing projects including grid.org, World Community Grid, Cell Computing, and Hikari Grid.

Most of these systems have the same basic structure: a client program runs on the volunteer's computer. It periodically contacts project-operated servers over the Internet, requesting jobs and reporting the results of completed jobs. This "pull" model is necessary because many volunteer computers are behind firewalls that do not allow incoming connections. The system keeps track of each user's "credit", a numerical measure of how much work that user's computers have done for the project.

Volunteer computing systems must deal with several issues involving volunteered computers: their heterogeneity, their churn (the tendency of individual computers to join and leave the network over time), their sporadic availability, and the need to not interfere with their performance during regular use.

In addition, volunteer computing systems must deal with problems related to correctness:

- Volunteers are unaccountable and essentially anonymous.
- Some volunteer computers (especially those that are overclocked) occasionally malfunction and return incorrect results.
- Some volunteers intentionally return incorrect results or claim excessive credit for results.

One common approach to these problems is replicated computing, in which each job is performed on at least two computers. The results (and the corresponding credit) are accepted only if they agree sufficiently.

== Drawbacks for participants ==
- Increased power consumption: A CPU generally uses more electricity when it is active compared to when it is idle. Additionally, the desire to participate may cause the volunteer to leave the PC on overnight or disable power-saving features like suspend. Furthermore, if the computer cannot cool itself adequately, the added load on the volunteer's CPU can cause it to overheat.
- Decreased performance of the PC: If the volunteer computing application runs while the computer is in use, it may impact performance of the PC. This is due to increased usage of the CPU, CPU cache, local storage, and network connection. If RAM is a limitation, increased disk cache misses or increased paging can result. Volunteer computing applications typically execute at a lower CPU scheduling priority, which helps to alleviate CPU contention.

These effects may or may not be noticeable, and even if they are noticeable, the volunteer might choose to continue participating. However, the increased power consumption can be remedied to some extent by setting an option to limit the percentage of the processor used by the client, which is available in some client software.

== Benefits for researchers ==
=== Computing power ===
Volunteer computing can provide researchers with computing power that is not achievable any other way. For example, Folding@home has been ranked as one of the world's fastest computing systems. With heightened interest and volunteer participation in the project as a result of the COVID-19 pandemic, the system achieved a speed of approximately 1.22 exaflops by late March 2020 and reached 2.43 exaflops by April 12, 2020, making it the world's first exaflop computing system.

=== Cost ===
Volunteer computing is often cheaper than other forms of distributed computing, and typically at zero cost to the end researcher.

== Importance ==
Although there are issues such as lack of accountability and trust between participants and researchers while implementing the projects, volunteer computing is crucially important, especially to projects that have limited funding.

- Supercomputers that have huge computing power are extremely expensive and are available only to some applications only if they can afford it. Whereas volunteer computing is not something that can be bought, its power arises from the public support. A research project that has limited sources and funding can get huge computing power by attracting public attention.
- By volunteering and providing support and computing power to the researches on topics such as science, citizens are encouraged to be interested in science and also citizens are allowed to have a voice in directions of scientific researches and eventually the future science by providing support or not to the researches.

== See also ==
- Citizen science
- Cloud computing
- List of volunteer computing projects
- Peer-to-peer
- Swarm intelligence
- Virtual volunteering
