= Meanings of minor-planet names: 189001–190000 =

As minor planet discoveries are confirmed, they are given a permanent number by the IAU's Minor Planet Center (MPC), and the discoverers can then submit names for them, following the IAU's naming conventions. The list below concerns those minor planets in the specified number-range that have received names, and explains the meanings of those names.

Official naming citations of newly named small Solar System bodies are approved and published in a bulletin by IAU's Working Group for Small Bodies Nomenclature (WGSBN). Before May 2021, citations were published in MPC's Minor Planet Circulars for many decades. Recent citations can also be found on the JPL Small-Body Database (SBDB). Until his death in 2016, German astronomer Lutz D. Schmadel compiled these citations into the Dictionary of Minor Planet Names (DMP) and regularly updated the collection.

Based on Paul Herget's The Names of the Minor Planets, Schmadel also researched the unclear origin of numerous asteroids, most of which had been named prior to World War II. This article incorporates text from this source, which is in the public domain: SBDB New namings may only be added to this list below after official publication as the preannouncement of names is condemned. The WGSBN publishes a comprehensive guideline for the naming rules of non-cometary small Solar System bodies.

== 189001–189100 ==
Named minor planet	Provisional	This minor planet was named for...	Ref · Catalog
189004 Capys	3184 T-3	Capys, king of Dardania, from Classical mythology. He was the son of Assaracus and the father of Anchises.	JPL · 189004
189011 Ogmios	1997 NJ_{6}	Ogmios, Celtic patron god of scholars and the personification of eloquence and persuasiveness	JPL · 189011
189018 Guokeda	1998 TC_{19}	The University of the Chinese Academy of Sciences (UCAS), also known as "Guokeda", is the first and largest graduate education institution in the P.R. China, having granted the country's first Ph.D.s in science and in engineering. UCAS started enrolling undergraduate students in 2014.	JPL · 189018
189035 Michaelsummers	2000 CX_{109}	Michael E. Summers (born 1954) is a professor of planetary sciences and astronomy at George Mason University. He worked as a co-investigator and as a Deputy Atmospheres Team Lead for the New Horizons mission to Pluto.	JPL · 189035

== 189101–189200 ==
back to top

Named minor planet	Provisional	This minor planet was named for...	Ref · Catalog
189188 Floraliën	2003 FL_{6}	The Gentse Floraliën (Floralies of Ghent) is a world-famous flower exhibition held in Ghent (Belgium) every five years	JPL · 189188

== 189201–189300 ==
back to top

Named minor planet	Provisional	This minor planet was named for...	Ref · Catalog
189202 Calar Alto	2003 SM_{15}	Calar Alto Observatory, in the Sierra de los Filabres in Andalusia, southern Spain	JPL · 189202
189261 Hiroo	2004 XO_{62}	Hiroo Itagaki (1949–1977), brother of the Japanese amateur astronomer Kōichi Itagaki who discovered this minor planet	JPL · 189261
189264 Gerardjeong	2005 GY_{108}	Gerard K. Jeong (born 1973), humanitarian, healer, and spine surgeon at Tucson Orthopedic Institute	JPL · 189264

== 189301–189400 ==
back to top

Named minor planet	Provisional	This minor planet was named for...	Ref · Catalog
189310 Polydamas	2006 AJ_{82}	Polydamas from Greek mythology. He was a Trojan commander during the Trojan War whose battle strategy was more cautious than that of his friend Hektor.	JPL · 189310
189312 Jameyszalay	2006 JN_{62}	Jamey R. Szalay (born 1988), an Associate Research Scholar at Princeton University who worked as a PhD student with the Student Dust Counter Instrument for the New Horizons mission to Pluto.	JPL · 189312
189320 Lakitsferenc	2006 YC_{14}	Ferenc Lakits (1859–1919), a Hungarian astronomer and teacher.	IAU · 189320
189347 Qian	2008 BQ_{15}	Qian Zhongshu (1910–1998), Chinese literary scholar and writer	JPL · 189347
189396 Sielewicz	2008 JB_{6}	Henryk Sielewicz (born 1949), a Lithuanian amateur astronomer	JPL · 189396
189398 Soemmerring	2008 JG_{20}	Samuel Thomas von Sömmerring (1755–1830), German anthropologist, anatomist, paleontologist and inventor	JPL · 189398

== 189401–189500 ==
back to top

Named minor planet	Provisional	This minor planet was named for...	Ref · Catalog
There are no named minor planets in this number range

== 189501–189600 ==
back to top

Named minor planet	Provisional	This minor planet was named for...	Ref · Catalog
There are no named minor planets in this number range

== 189601–189700 ==
back to top

Named minor planet	Provisional	This minor planet was named for...	Ref · Catalog
There are no named minor planets in this number range

== 189701–189800 ==
back to top

Named minor planet	Provisional	This minor planet was named for...	Ref · Catalog
189795 McGehee	2002 ER_{159}	Peregrine McGehee (born 1960), an American astronomer and a contributor to the Sloan Digital Sky Survey.[MPC 85412]	MPC · 189795

== 189801–189900 ==
back to top

Named minor planet	Provisional	This minor planet was named for...	Ref · Catalog
189848 Eivissa	2003 FF_{2}	Eivissa (Ibiza in Spanish) is the westernmost of the Balearic islands	JPL · 189848

== 189901–190000 ==
back to top

Named minor planet	Provisional	This minor planet was named for...	Ref · Catalog
189930 Jeanneherbert	2003 SR_{200}	Jeanne Herbert (born 1958), a grants management specialist for the Bisbee (Arizona) Unified School District	JPL · 189930
189944 Leblanc	2003 TX	Thierry Leblanc (born 1967), the group supervisor of the Atmospheric Lidar Group, and Principal Investigator of stratospheric and tropospheric ozone, and temperature lidar measurements at the Table Mountain Observatory.	JPL · 189944
189945 Teddykareta	2003 TP_{3}	Theodore Kareta (born 1995) an American planetary scientist who studies small Solar System bodies, in particular active asteroids, comets, and centaurs with ground-based telescopes in the visible and near-infrared spectrum at Lowell Observatory (Src, Src).	IAU · 189945
189948 Richswanson	2003 UM_{4}	Rich Swanson (born 1964) is an intelligence specialist for a contractor to the Department of Defense at Ft. Huachuca, Arizona	JPL · 189948

back to top

Preceded by 188,001–189,000	Meanings of minor-planet names List of minor planets: 189,001–190,000	Succeeded by 190,001–191,000
