= List of minor planets: 189001–190000 =

The following is a partial list of minor planets, running from minor-planet number 189001 through 190000, inclusive. The primary data for this and other partial lists is based on JPL's "Small-Body Orbital Elements" and data available from the Minor Planet Center. Critical list information is also provided by the MPC, unless otherwise specified from Lowell Observatory. A detailed description of the table's columns and additional sources are given on the main page including a complete list of every page in this series, and a statistical break-up on the dynamical classification of minor planets.

Also see the summary list of all named bodies in numerical and alphabetical order, and the corresponding naming citations for the number range of this particular list. New namings may only be added to this list after official publication, as the preannouncement of names is condemned by the Working Group for Small Bodies Nomenclature of the International Astronomical Union.

| Near-Earth obj. | MBA (inner) | MBA (outer) | Centaur |
| Mars-crosser | MBA (middle) | Jupiter trojan | Trans-Neptunian obj. |
| Unclassified |

== 189001–189100 ==
| Designation | | | Discovery | | | Properties | | Ref |
| Permanent | Provisional | Named after | Date | Site | Discoverer(s) | Category | Diam. | Ref |
|---|---|---|---|---|---|---|---|---|
| 189001 | 4889 P-L | — | September 24, 1960 | Palomar | C. J. van Houten, I. van Houten-Groeneveld, T. Gehrels | · | 3.4 km | MPC · JPL |
| 189002 | 6760 P-L | — | September 24, 1960 | Palomar | C. J. van Houten, I. van Houten-Groeneveld, T. Gehrels | · | 1.5 km | MPC · JPL |
| 189003 | 3009 T-3 | — | October 16, 1977 | Palomar | C. J. van Houten, I. van Houten-Groeneveld, T. Gehrels | · | 4.4 km | MPC · JPL |
| 189004 Capys | 3184 T-3 | Capys | October 16, 1977 | Palomar | C. J. van Houten, I. van Houten-Groeneveld, T. Gehrels | L5 | 10 km | MPC · JPL |
| 189005 | 5176 T-3 | — | October 16, 1977 | Palomar | C. J. van Houten, I. van Houten-Groeneveld, T. Gehrels | · | 2.9 km | MPC · JPL |
| 189006 | 1993 VG_{7} | — | November 9, 1993 | Kitt Peak | Spacewatch | · | 3.7 km | MPC · JPL |
| 189007 | 1995 FW_{7} | — | March 25, 1995 | Kitt Peak | Spacewatch | · | 2.2 km | MPC · JPL |
| 189008 | 1996 FR_{3} | — | March 26, 1996 | Haleakala | NEAT | APO +1km | 1.9 km | MPC · JPL |
| 189009 | 1997 BG_{5} | — | January 31, 1997 | Kitt Peak | Spacewatch | · | 910 m | MPC · JPL |
| 189010 | 1997 KW_{3} | — | May 30, 1997 | Kitt Peak | Spacewatch | · | 1.4 km | MPC · JPL |
| 189011 Ogmios | 1997 NJ_{6} | Ogmios | July 8, 1997 | Caussols | ODAS | AMO | 540 m | MPC · JPL |
| 189012 | 1998 FO_{98} | — | March 31, 1998 | Socorro | LINEAR | · | 1.0 km | MPC · JPL |
| 189013 | 1998 QD_{3} | — | August 17, 1998 | Socorro | LINEAR | · | 1.2 km | MPC · JPL |
| 189014 | 1998 QJ_{55} | — | August 25, 1998 | Caussols | ODAS | · | 1.1 km | MPC · JPL |
| 189015 | 1998 QH_{83} | — | August 24, 1998 | Socorro | LINEAR | · | 1 km | MPC · JPL |
| 189016 | 1998 RS_{37} | — | September 14, 1998 | Socorro | LINEAR | · | 4.3 km | MPC · JPL |
| 189017 | 1998 SM_{136} | — | September 26, 1998 | Socorro | LINEAR | · | 5.4 km | MPC · JPL |
| 189018 Guokeda | 1998 TC_{19} | Guokeda | October 14, 1998 | Xinglong | SCAP | · | 5.8 km | MPC · JPL |
| 189019 | 1998 VR_{26} | — | November 10, 1998 | Socorro | LINEAR | · | 5.3 km | MPC · JPL |
| 189020 | 1998 YU_{3} | — | December 17, 1998 | Višnjan Observatory | K. Korlević | · | 3.2 km | MPC · JPL |
| 189021 | 1999 CS_{11} | — | February 12, 1999 | Socorro | LINEAR | H | 1.2 km | MPC · JPL |
| 189022 | 1999 JA_{94} | — | May 12, 1999 | Socorro | LINEAR | · | 3.0 km | MPC · JPL |
| 189023 | 1999 NV_{19} | — | July 14, 1999 | Socorro | LINEAR | fast? | 4.9 km | MPC · JPL |
| 189024 | 1999 RN_{147} | — | September 9, 1999 | Socorro | LINEAR | DOR | 4.1 km | MPC · JPL |
| 189025 | 1999 RG_{162} | — | September 9, 1999 | Socorro | LINEAR | · | 1.3 km | MPC · JPL |
| 189026 | 1999 RH_{240} | — | September 11, 1999 | Anderson Mesa | LONEOS | · | 3.1 km | MPC · JPL |
| 189027 | 1999 SS_{25} | — | September 29, 1999 | Catalina | CSS | · | 3.6 km | MPC · JPL |
| 189028 | 1999 TM_{209} | — | October 14, 1999 | Socorro | LINEAR | · | 5.6 km | MPC · JPL |
| 189029 | 1999 UA_{27} | — | October 31, 1999 | Catalina | CSS | EMA | 5.5 km | MPC · JPL |
| 189030 | 1999 XU_{3} | — | December 4, 1999 | Catalina | CSS | · | 1.1 km | MPC · JPL |
| 189031 | 1999 XF_{48} | — | December 7, 1999 | Socorro | LINEAR | · | 4.0 km | MPC · JPL |
| 189032 | 1999 XA_{114} | — | December 11, 1999 | Socorro | LINEAR | · | 4.2 km | MPC · JPL |
| 189033 | 2000 AC_{9} | — | January 2, 2000 | Socorro | LINEAR | · | 6.2 km | MPC · JPL |
| 189034 | 2000 AZ_{226} | — | January 9, 2000 | Kitt Peak | Spacewatch | · | 1.7 km | MPC · JPL |
| 189035 Michaelsummers | 2000 CX_{109} | Michaelsummers | February 5, 2000 | Kitt Peak | M. W. Buie | EUP | 6.6 km | MPC · JPL |
| 189036 | 2000 EB_{64} | — | March 10, 2000 | Socorro | LINEAR | · | 2.3 km | MPC · JPL |
| 189037 | 2000 GV_{4} | — | April 6, 2000 | Socorro | LINEAR | H | 790 m | MPC · JPL |
| 189038 | 2000 KY_{36} | — | May 29, 2000 | Socorro | LINEAR | PHO | 1.5 km | MPC · JPL |
| 189039 | 2000 LA_{25} | — | June 1, 2000 | Socorro | LINEAR | PHO | 4.6 km | MPC · JPL |
| 189040 | 2000 MU_{1} | — | June 24, 2000 | Socorro | LINEAR | APO · PHA | 380 m | MPC · JPL |
| 189041 | 2000 OR_{2} | — | July 24, 2000 | Eskridge | G. Hug | H | 1.0 km | MPC · JPL |
| 189042 | 2000 OV_{32} | — | July 30, 2000 | Socorro | LINEAR | · | 3.3 km | MPC · JPL |
| 189043 | 2000 OR_{67} | — | July 23, 2000 | Socorro | LINEAR | · | 2.2 km | MPC · JPL |
| 189044 | 2000 PB_{3} | — | August 1, 2000 | Eskridge | G. Hug | EUN | 3.3 km | MPC · JPL |
| 189045 | 2000 QL_{18} | — | August 24, 2000 | Socorro | LINEAR | · | 2.3 km | MPC · JPL |
| 189046 | 2000 QR_{30} | — | August 25, 2000 | Socorro | LINEAR | · | 2.4 km | MPC · JPL |
| 189047 | 2000 QP_{117} | — | August 29, 2000 | Socorro | LINEAR | H | 1.0 km | MPC · JPL |
| 189048 | 2000 QG_{169} | — | August 31, 2000 | Socorro | LINEAR | · | 2.0 km | MPC · JPL |
| 189049 | 2000 QN_{172} | — | August 31, 2000 | Socorro | LINEAR | · | 2.2 km | MPC · JPL |
| 189050 | 2000 RE_{32} | — | September 1, 2000 | Socorro | LINEAR | EUN | 2.0 km | MPC · JPL |
| 189051 | 2000 RO_{101} | — | September 5, 2000 | Anderson Mesa | LONEOS | MAR | 2.1 km | MPC · JPL |
| 189052 | 2000 SJ_{197} | — | September 24, 2000 | Socorro | LINEAR | EOS | 4.8 km | MPC · JPL |
| 189053 | 2000 SW_{271} | — | September 27, 2000 | Socorro | LINEAR | EUN | 2.4 km | MPC · JPL |
| 189054 | 2000 SW_{278} | — | September 30, 2000 | Socorro | LINEAR | · | 3.0 km | MPC · JPL |
| 189055 | 2000 SG_{339} | — | September 25, 2000 | Socorro | LINEAR | · | 2.7 km | MPC · JPL |
| 189056 | 2000 SU_{363} | — | September 20, 2000 | Socorro | LINEAR | · | 2.6 km | MPC · JPL |
| 189057 | 2000 TE_{22} | — | October 3, 2000 | Socorro | LINEAR | · | 1.7 km | MPC · JPL |
| 189058 | 2000 UT_{16} | — | October 29, 2000 | Socorro | LINEAR | AMO +1km | 1.7 km | MPC · JPL |
| 189059 | 2000 UX_{63} | — | October 25, 2000 | Socorro | LINEAR | · | 3.4 km | MPC · JPL |
| 189060 | 2000 UJ_{68} | — | October 25, 2000 | Socorro | LINEAR | · | 3.7 km | MPC · JPL |
| 189061 | 2000 UJ_{110} | — | October 31, 2000 | Socorro | LINEAR | EUN | 2.1 km | MPC · JPL |
| 189062 | 2000 VA_{45} | — | November 2, 2000 | Socorro | LINEAR | AMO | 750 m | MPC · JPL |
| 189063 | 2000 VZ_{57} | — | November 3, 2000 | Socorro | LINEAR | · | 2.8 km | MPC · JPL |
| 189064 | 2000 WL_{14} | — | November 20, 2000 | Socorro | LINEAR | EUN | 2.4 km | MPC · JPL |
| 189065 | 2000 WR_{72} | — | November 20, 2000 | Socorro | LINEAR | · | 3.1 km | MPC · JPL |
| 189066 | 2000 WC_{74} | — | November 20, 2000 | Socorro | LINEAR | · | 3.1 km | MPC · JPL |
| 189067 | 2000 WT_{133} | — | November 19, 2000 | Socorro | LINEAR | ADE | 3.9 km | MPC · JPL |
| 189068 | 2000 WX_{178} | — | November 25, 2000 | Socorro | LINEAR | · | 3.3 km | MPC · JPL |
| 189069 | 2000 YZ_{29} | — | December 26, 2000 | Haleakala | NEAT | ADE | 3.4 km | MPC · JPL |
| 189070 | 2001 BD_{39} | — | January 19, 2001 | Kitt Peak | Spacewatch | HYG | 3.7 km | MPC · JPL |
| 189071 | 2001 BH_{83} | — | January 18, 2001 | Socorro | LINEAR | EUP · slow | 5.9 km | MPC · JPL |
| 189072 | 2001 DB_{8} | — | February 16, 2001 | Kitt Peak | Spacewatch | THM | 2.6 km | MPC · JPL |
| 189073 | 2001 DJ_{50} | — | February 16, 2001 | Socorro | LINEAR | · | 5.8 km | MPC · JPL |
| 189074 | 2001 DA_{65} | — | February 19, 2001 | Socorro | LINEAR | · | 5.5 km | MPC · JPL |
| 189075 | 2001 DP_{105} | — | February 16, 2001 | Anderson Mesa | LONEOS | · | 6.2 km | MPC · JPL |
| 189076 | 2001 HN | — | April 16, 2001 | Emerald Lane | L. Ball | · | 8.2 km | MPC · JPL |
| 189077 | 2001 HE_{11} | — | April 18, 2001 | Socorro | LINEAR | · | 950 m | MPC · JPL |
| 189078 | 2001 KT_{37} | — | May 22, 2001 | Socorro | LINEAR | · | 1.4 km | MPC · JPL |
| 189079 | 2001 KJ_{59} | — | May 26, 2001 | Socorro | LINEAR | PHO | 2.3 km | MPC · JPL |
| 189080 | 2001 MO_{6} | — | June 21, 2001 | Palomar | NEAT | · | 1.7 km | MPC · JPL |
| 189081 | 2001 MM_{16} | — | June 27, 2001 | Palomar | NEAT | · | 1.5 km | MPC · JPL |
| 189082 | 2001 OL_{12} | — | July 20, 2001 | Palomar | NEAT | · | 1.7 km | MPC · JPL |
| 189083 | 2001 OV_{46} | — | July 16, 2001 | Anderson Mesa | LONEOS | · | 1.7 km | MPC · JPL |
| 189084 | 2001 OV_{61} | — | July 21, 2001 | Haleakala | NEAT | NYS | 1.9 km | MPC · JPL |
| 189085 | 2001 OF_{89} | — | July 21, 2001 | Haleakala | NEAT | · | 1.1 km | MPC · JPL |
| 189086 | 2001 OT_{89} | — | July 23, 2001 | Haleakala | NEAT | · | 2.2 km | MPC · JPL |
| 189087 | 2001 PE_{15} | — | August 13, 2001 | San Marcello | A. Boattini, L. Tesi | · | 2.0 km | MPC · JPL |
| 189088 | 2001 PO_{15} | — | August 9, 2001 | Palomar | NEAT | · | 1.8 km | MPC · JPL |
| 189089 | 2001 PG_{46} | — | August 12, 2001 | Palomar | NEAT | PHO | 1.6 km | MPC · JPL |
| 189090 | 2001 QJ_{17} | — | August 16, 2001 | Socorro | LINEAR | NYS | 2.0 km | MPC · JPL |
| 189091 | 2001 QX_{61} | — | August 16, 2001 | Socorro | LINEAR | · | 2.1 km | MPC · JPL |
| 189092 | 2001 QU_{65} | — | August 17, 2001 | Socorro | LINEAR | · | 1.6 km | MPC · JPL |
| 189093 | 2001 QL_{164} | — | August 21, 2001 | Haleakala | NEAT | NYS | 2.1 km | MPC · JPL |
| 189094 | 2001 QR_{180} | — | August 25, 2001 | Palomar | NEAT | · | 1.9 km | MPC · JPL |
| 189095 | 2001 QH_{211} | — | August 23, 2001 | Anderson Mesa | LONEOS | · | 2.3 km | MPC · JPL |
| 189096 | 2001 QL_{222} | — | August 24, 2001 | Anderson Mesa | LONEOS | · | 1.9 km | MPC · JPL |
| 189097 | 2001 QA_{247} | — | August 24, 2001 | Socorro | LINEAR | MAS | 1.1 km | MPC · JPL |
| 189098 | 2001 QB_{274} | — | August 19, 2001 | Socorro | LINEAR | · | 1.4 km | MPC · JPL |
| 189099 | 2001 RO | — | September 7, 2001 | Socorro | LINEAR | · | 4.2 km | MPC · JPL |
| 189100 | 2001 RQ_{54} | — | September 12, 2001 | Socorro | LINEAR | · | 2.0 km | MPC · JPL |

== 189101–189200 ==
back to top

| Designation | | | Discovery | | | Properties | | Ref |
| Permanent | Provisional | Named after | Date | Site | Discoverer(s) | Category | Diam. | Ref |
|---|---|---|---|---|---|---|---|---|
| 189101 | 2001 RW_{112} | — | September 12, 2001 | Socorro | LINEAR | NYS | 1.9 km | MPC · JPL |
| 189102 | 2001 SY_{19} | — | September 16, 2001 | Socorro | LINEAR | NYS | 1.7 km | MPC · JPL |
| 189103 | 2001 SG_{28} | — | September 16, 2001 | Socorro | LINEAR | MAS | 980 m | MPC · JPL |
| 189104 | 2001 SV_{97} | — | September 20, 2001 | Socorro | LINEAR | NYS | 1.2 km | MPC · JPL |
| 189105 | 2001 ST_{105} | — | September 20, 2001 | Socorro | LINEAR | · | 2.7 km | MPC · JPL |
| 189106 | 2001 SG_{215} | — | September 19, 2001 | Socorro | LINEAR | · | 1.8 km | MPC · JPL |
| 189107 | 2001 SW_{280} | — | September 21, 2001 | Anderson Mesa | LONEOS | · | 2.6 km | MPC · JPL |
| 189108 | 2001 SW_{337} | — | September 20, 2001 | Socorro | LINEAR | NYS | 1.5 km | MPC · JPL |
| 189109 | 2001 TA_{40} | — | October 14, 2001 | Socorro | LINEAR | · | 1.8 km | MPC · JPL |
| 189110 | 2001 TR_{55} | — | October 15, 2001 | Socorro | LINEAR | · | 2.6 km | MPC · JPL |
| 189111 | 2001 TC_{125} | — | October 12, 2001 | Haleakala | NEAT | · | 2.2 km | MPC · JPL |
| 189112 | 2001 UO_{19} | — | October 16, 2001 | Palomar | NEAT | · | 1.5 km | MPC · JPL |
| 189113 | 2001 UA_{153} | — | October 23, 2001 | Socorro | LINEAR | MAS | 1.3 km | MPC · JPL |
| 189114 | 2001 UO_{165} | — | October 23, 2001 | Palomar | NEAT | T_{j} (2.99) · HIL · 3:2 · (6124) | 9.0 km | MPC · JPL |
| 189115 | 2001 UE_{167} | — | October 19, 2001 | Socorro | LINEAR | · | 2.9 km | MPC · JPL |
| 189116 | 2001 US_{202} | — | October 19, 2001 | Kitt Peak | Spacewatch | · | 2.1 km | MPC · JPL |
| 189117 | 2001 VD_{5} | — | November 11, 2001 | Socorro | LINEAR | H | 980 m | MPC · JPL |
| 189118 | 2001 VD_{47} | — | November 9, 2001 | Socorro | LINEAR | · | 2.8 km | MPC · JPL |
| 189119 | 2001 VZ_{91} | — | November 15, 2001 | Socorro | LINEAR | · | 1.3 km | MPC · JPL |
| 189120 | 2001 WQ_{7} | — | November 17, 2001 | Socorro | LINEAR | · | 2.3 km | MPC · JPL |
| 189121 | 2001 WY_{13} | — | November 17, 2001 | Socorro | LINEAR | H | 1.0 km | MPC · JPL |
| 189122 | 2001 WF_{60} | — | November 19, 2001 | Socorro | LINEAR | · | 3.6 km | MPC · JPL |
| 189123 | 2001 WW_{70} | — | November 20, 2001 | Socorro | LINEAR | · | 1.7 km | MPC · JPL |
| 189124 | 2001 XO_{21} | — | December 9, 2001 | Socorro | LINEAR | EUN | 2.3 km | MPC · JPL |
| 189125 | 2001 XW_{55} | — | December 10, 2001 | Socorro | LINEAR | · | 2.1 km | MPC · JPL |
| 189126 | 2001 XX_{81} | — | December 11, 2001 | Socorro | LINEAR | · | 2.3 km | MPC · JPL |
| 189127 | 2001 XT_{82} | — | December 11, 2001 | Socorro | LINEAR | · | 2.4 km | MPC · JPL |
| 189128 | 2001 XV_{133} | — | December 14, 2001 | Socorro | LINEAR | NYS | 1.9 km | MPC · JPL |
| 189129 | 2001 XH_{173} | — | December 14, 2001 | Socorro | LINEAR | · | 5.1 km | MPC · JPL |
| 189130 | 2001 XT_{189} | — | December 14, 2001 | Socorro | LINEAR | · | 3.3 km | MPC · JPL |
| 189131 | 2001 XM_{249} | — | December 13, 2001 | Socorro | LINEAR | · | 1.6 km | MPC · JPL |
| 189132 | 2001 YB_{19} | — | December 17, 2001 | Socorro | LINEAR | · | 2.1 km | MPC · JPL |
| 189133 | 2001 YG_{112} | — | December 19, 2001 | Socorro | LINEAR | PHO | 2.3 km | MPC · JPL |
| 189134 | 2002 AT_{11} | — | January 9, 2002 | Socorro | LINEAR | H | 980 m | MPC · JPL |
| 189135 | 2002 AQ_{146} | — | January 13, 2002 | Socorro | LINEAR | · | 3.3 km | MPC · JPL |
| 189136 | 2002 BF_{29} | — | January 20, 2002 | Anderson Mesa | LONEOS | EUN | 2.8 km | MPC · JPL |
| 189137 | 2002 CT_{43} | — | February 8, 2002 | Socorro | LINEAR | H | 1.0 km | MPC · JPL |
| 189138 | 2002 CL_{50} | — | February 12, 2002 | Desert Eagle | W. K. Y. Yeung | · | 2.3 km | MPC · JPL |
| 189139 | 2002 CL_{128} | — | February 7, 2002 | Socorro | LINEAR | · | 2.6 km | MPC · JPL |
| 189140 | 2002 CT_{136} | — | February 8, 2002 | Socorro | LINEAR | · | 3.4 km | MPC · JPL |
| 189141 | 2002 DO_{2} | — | February 19, 2002 | Socorro | LINEAR | · | 5.3 km | MPC · JPL |
| 189142 | 2002 FK_{35} | — | March 21, 2002 | Anderson Mesa | LONEOS | · | 4.1 km | MPC · JPL |
| 189143 | 2002 GU_{1} | — | April 2, 2002 | Kvistaberg | Uppsala-DLR Asteroid Survey | · | 4.7 km | MPC · JPL |
| 189144 | 2002 GF_{7} | — | April 12, 2002 | Desert Eagle | W. K. Y. Yeung | EUP | 7.6 km | MPC · JPL |
| 189145 | 2002 GU_{47} | — | April 4, 2002 | Haleakala | NEAT | · | 5.0 km | MPC · JPL |
| 189146 | 2002 GQ_{68} | — | April 8, 2002 | Socorro | LINEAR | · | 4.1 km | MPC · JPL |
| 189147 | 2002 GS_{141} | — | April 13, 2002 | Palomar | NEAT | · | 4.6 km | MPC · JPL |
| 189148 | 2002 GA_{157} | — | April 13, 2002 | Palomar | NEAT | · | 5.2 km | MPC · JPL |
| 189149 | 2002 GE_{175} | — | April 11, 2002 | Socorro | LINEAR | · | 4.5 km | MPC · JPL |
| 189150 | 2002 HV_{7} | — | April 20, 2002 | Kitt Peak | Spacewatch | fast | 3.2 km | MPC · JPL |
| 189151 | 2002 JE_{12} | — | May 3, 2002 | Desert Eagle | W. K. Y. Yeung | · | 4.7 km | MPC · JPL |
| 189152 | 2002 JP_{14} | — | May 7, 2002 | Socorro | LINEAR | EUP | 8.1 km | MPC · JPL |
| 189153 | 2002 JZ_{39} | — | May 7, 2002 | Socorro | LINEAR | · | 5.9 km | MPC · JPL |
| 189154 | 2002 JO_{43} | — | May 9, 2002 | Socorro | LINEAR | · | 6.0 km | MPC · JPL |
| 189155 | 2002 JK_{58} | — | May 9, 2002 | Socorro | LINEAR | · | 9.7 km | MPC · JPL |
| 189156 | 2002 JO_{117} | — | May 4, 2002 | Anderson Mesa | LONEOS | · | 6.0 km | MPC · JPL |
| 189157 | 2002 JT_{118} | — | May 5, 2002 | Anderson Mesa | LONEOS | · | 5.1 km | MPC · JPL |
| 189158 | 2002 JZ_{131} | — | May 9, 2002 | Palomar | NEAT | · | 2.6 km | MPC · JPL |
| 189159 | 2002 LZ_{19} | — | June 6, 2002 | Socorro | LINEAR | TIR | 5.3 km | MPC · JPL |
| 189160 | 2002 LV_{32} | — | June 3, 2002 | Socorro | LINEAR | · | 6.3 km | MPC · JPL |
| 189161 | 2002 QF_{6} | — | August 17, 2002 | Socorro | LINEAR | PHO | 2.3 km | MPC · JPL |
| 189162 | 2002 QQ_{10} | — | August 17, 2002 | Palomar | NEAT | AEG | 5.9 km | MPC · JPL |
| 189163 | 2002 RK_{250} | — | September 6, 2002 | Socorro | LINEAR | · | 1.3 km | MPC · JPL |
| 189164 | 2002 TF_{4} | — | October 1, 2002 | Anderson Mesa | LONEOS | · | 940 m | MPC · JPL |
| 189165 | 2002 TQ_{96} | — | October 11, 2002 | Socorro | LINEAR | · | 1.6 km | MPC · JPL |
| 189166 | 2002 TW_{226} | — | October 8, 2002 | Anderson Mesa | LONEOS | · | 1.3 km | MPC · JPL |
| 189167 | 2002 TU_{264} | — | October 10, 2002 | Socorro | LINEAR | · | 1.5 km | MPC · JPL |
| 189168 | 2002 VF_{14} | — | November 5, 2002 | Socorro | LINEAR | · | 1.1 km | MPC · JPL |
| 189169 | 2002 VQ_{17} | — | November 5, 2002 | Socorro | LINEAR | · | 1.2 km | MPC · JPL |
| 189170 | 2002 VH_{66} | — | November 8, 2002 | Socorro | LINEAR | · | 1.3 km | MPC · JPL |
| 189171 | 2002 VX_{87} | — | November 8, 2002 | Socorro | LINEAR | · | 1.2 km | MPC · JPL |
| 189172 | 2002 VT_{133} | — | November 6, 2002 | Anderson Mesa | LONEOS | · | 1.5 km | MPC · JPL |
| 189173 | 2002 XY_{4} | — | December 5, 2002 | Socorro | LINEAR | APO | 580 m | MPC · JPL |
| 189174 | 2002 XW_{27} | — | December 5, 2002 | Fountain Hills | Hills, Fountain | · | 1.7 km | MPC · JPL |
| 189175 | 2002 XK_{49} | — | December 10, 2002 | Socorro | LINEAR | · | 1.1 km | MPC · JPL |
| 189176 | 2002 XJ_{94} | — | December 1, 2002 | Socorro | LINEAR | · | 3.0 km | MPC · JPL |
| 189177 | 2002 XW_{117} | — | December 10, 2002 | Palomar | NEAT | · | 4.0 km | MPC · JPL |
| 189178 | 2002 YQ_{25} | — | December 31, 2002 | Socorro | LINEAR | · | 1.6 km | MPC · JPL |
| 189179 | 2002 YS_{27} | — | December 31, 2002 | Socorro | LINEAR | · | 2.1 km | MPC · JPL |
| 189180 | 2003 AH_{8} | — | January 3, 2003 | Eskridge | Farpoint | · | 1.1 km | MPC · JPL |
| 189181 | 2003 AS_{66} | — | January 7, 2003 | Socorro | LINEAR | · | 3.0 km | MPC · JPL |
| 189182 | 2003 BW_{12} | — | January 26, 2003 | Haleakala | NEAT | · | 1.6 km | MPC · JPL |
| 189183 | 2003 BN_{16} | — | January 26, 2003 | Haleakala | NEAT | · | 2.0 km | MPC · JPL |
| 189184 | 2003 BM_{32} | — | January 27, 2003 | Anderson Mesa | LONEOS | · | 1.7 km | MPC · JPL |
| 189185 | 2003 CM_{7} | — | February 1, 2003 | Anderson Mesa | LONEOS | · | 2.7 km | MPC · JPL |
| 189186 | 2003 CU_{25} | — | February 9, 2003 | Palomar | NEAT | · | 2.2 km | MPC · JPL |
| 189187 | 2003 EY_{24} | — | March 6, 2003 | Anderson Mesa | LONEOS | · | 3.0 km | MPC · JPL |
| 189188 Floraliën | 2003 FL_{6} | Floraliën | March 27, 2003 | Uccle | T. Pauwels | · | 3.9 km | MPC · JPL |
| 189189 | 2003 FN_{20} | — | March 23, 2003 | Palomar | NEAT | EUN | 2.3 km | MPC · JPL |
| 189190 | 2003 FR_{28} | — | March 24, 2003 | Haleakala | NEAT | · | 3.0 km | MPC · JPL |
| 189191 | 2003 FL_{30} | — | March 25, 2003 | Haleakala | NEAT | · | 3.2 km | MPC · JPL |
| 189192 | 2003 FE_{76} | — | March 27, 2003 | Palomar | NEAT | · | 3.0 km | MPC · JPL |
| 189193 | 2003 FO_{96} | — | March 30, 2003 | Kitt Peak | Spacewatch | · | 2.5 km | MPC · JPL |
| 189194 | 2003 LX_{1} | — | June 1, 2003 | Reedy Creek | J. Broughton | H | 1.5 km | MPC · JPL |
| 189195 | 2003 PB_{1} | — | August 1, 2003 | Socorro | LINEAR | · | 6.8 km | MPC · JPL |
| 189196 | 2003 QH_{28} | — | August 21, 2003 | Campo Imperatore | CINEOS | · | 4.6 km | MPC · JPL |
| 189197 | 2003 QF_{61} | — | August 23, 2003 | Socorro | LINEAR | LIX | 8.3 km | MPC · JPL |
| 189198 | 2003 QW_{71} | — | August 25, 2003 | Palomar | NEAT | · | 4.3 km | MPC · JPL |
| 189199 | 2003 RJ_{1} | — | September 2, 2003 | Socorro | LINEAR | THM | 5.3 km | MPC · JPL |
| 189200 | 2003 RS_{7} | — | September 4, 2003 | Reedy Creek | J. Broughton | · | 4.4 km | MPC · JPL |

== 189201–189300 ==
back to top

| Designation | | | Discovery | | | Properties | | Ref |
| Permanent | Provisional | Named after | Date | Site | Discoverer(s) | Category | Diam. | Ref |
|---|---|---|---|---|---|---|---|---|
| 189201 | 2003 RX_{14} | — | September 14, 2003 | Palomar | NEAT | · | 7.5 km | MPC · JPL |
| 189202 Calar Alto | 2003 SM_{15} | Calar Alto | September 17, 2003 | Heppenheim | F. Hormuth | · | 4.7 km | MPC · JPL |
| 189203 | 2003 SL_{40} | — | September 16, 2003 | Palomar | NEAT | HYG | 6.0 km | MPC · JPL |
| 189204 | 2003 ST_{78} | — | September 19, 2003 | Kitt Peak | Spacewatch | · | 6.4 km | MPC · JPL |
| 189205 | 2003 SY_{147} | — | September 16, 2003 | Socorro | LINEAR | · | 3.0 km | MPC · JPL |
| 189206 | 2003 SJ_{151} | — | September 17, 2003 | Socorro | LINEAR | URS | 7.4 km | MPC · JPL |
| 189207 | 2003 SW_{196} | — | September 21, 2003 | Anderson Mesa | LONEOS | EUP | 7.3 km | MPC · JPL |
| 189208 | 2003 SH_{200} | — | September 25, 2003 | Palomar | NEAT | · | 4.4 km | MPC · JPL |
| 189209 | 2003 SS_{224} | — | September 28, 2003 | Anderson Mesa | LONEOS | · | 7.5 km | MPC · JPL |
| 189210 | 2003 SM_{262} | — | September 28, 2003 | Socorro | LINEAR | · | 6.1 km | MPC · JPL |
| 189211 | 2003 UX_{10} | — | October 20, 2003 | Socorro | LINEAR | · | 4.4 km | MPC · JPL |
| 189212 | 2003 UY_{21} | — | October 22, 2003 | Kingsnake | J. V. McClusky | · | 6.1 km | MPC · JPL |
| 189213 | 2003 UU_{122} | — | October 19, 2003 | Socorro | LINEAR | THB | 5.7 km | MPC · JPL |
| 189214 | 2003 YJ_{20} | — | December 17, 2003 | Kitt Peak | Spacewatch | L5 | 10 km | MPC · JPL |
| 189215 | 2003 YF_{162} | — | December 17, 2003 | Socorro | LINEAR | L5 | 15 km | MPC · JPL |
| 189216 | 2004 BO_{95} | — | January 28, 2004 | Socorro | LINEAR | · | 2.9 km | MPC · JPL |
| 189217 | 2004 CR_{78} | — | February 11, 2004 | Palomar | NEAT | NYS | 1.0 km | MPC · JPL |
| 189218 | 2004 DC_{37} | — | February 19, 2004 | Socorro | LINEAR | · | 1.8 km | MPC · JPL |
| 189219 | 2004 EN_{31} | — | March 14, 2004 | Palomar | NEAT | · | 1.2 km | MPC · JPL |
| 189220 | 2004 EP_{83} | — | March 14, 2004 | Kitt Peak | Spacewatch | · | 1.9 km | MPC · JPL |
| 189221 | 2004 EN_{90} | — | March 14, 2004 | Kitt Peak | Spacewatch | · | 1.6 km | MPC · JPL |
| 189222 | 2004 FC_{10} | — | March 16, 2004 | Campo Imperatore | CINEOS | · | 1.8 km | MPC · JPL |
| 189223 | 2004 FG_{67} | — | March 20, 2004 | Socorro | LINEAR | (2076) | 1.3 km | MPC · JPL |
| 189224 | 2004 GD_{9} | — | April 12, 2004 | Anderson Mesa | LONEOS | · | 2.3 km | MPC · JPL |
| 189225 | 2004 GV_{58} | — | April 15, 2004 | Palomar | NEAT | · | 1.1 km | MPC · JPL |
| 189226 | 2004 GA_{76} | — | April 15, 2004 | Kitt Peak | Spacewatch | · | 1 km | MPC · JPL |
| 189227 | 2004 HE_{17} | — | April 16, 2004 | Kitt Peak | Spacewatch | · | 1.5 km | MPC · JPL |
| 189228 | 2004 JB_{31} | — | May 15, 2004 | Socorro | LINEAR | MAS | 960 m | MPC · JPL |
| 189229 | 2004 JC_{42} | — | May 15, 2004 | Socorro | LINEAR | · | 1.5 km | MPC · JPL |
| 189230 | 2004 LW_{17} | — | June 14, 2004 | Socorro | LINEAR | · | 2.5 km | MPC · JPL |
| 189231 | 2004 LW_{23} | — | June 14, 2004 | Bergisch Gladbach | W. Bickel | · | 2.5 km | MPC · JPL |
| 189232 | 2004 MJ_{8} | — | June 17, 2004 | Siding Spring | SSS | · | 2.6 km | MPC · JPL |
| 189233 | 2004 NP_{2} | — | July 10, 2004 | Catalina | CSS | · | 1.5 km | MPC · JPL |
| 189234 | 2004 NK_{16} | — | July 11, 2004 | Socorro | LINEAR | · | 1.8 km | MPC · JPL |
| 189235 | 2004 OR_{3} | — | July 16, 2004 | Socorro | LINEAR | · | 1.9 km | MPC · JPL |
| 189236 | 2004 OW_{11} | — | July 27, 2004 | Socorro | LINEAR | · | 2.1 km | MPC · JPL |
| 189237 | 2004 PB_{56} | — | August 8, 2004 | Anderson Mesa | LONEOS | · | 2.0 km | MPC · JPL |
| 189238 | 2004 PR_{99} | — | August 11, 2004 | Socorro | LINEAR | · | 3.5 km | MPC · JPL |
| 189239 | 2004 QR_{12} | — | August 21, 2004 | Siding Spring | SSS | · | 2.1 km | MPC · JPL |
| 189240 | 2004 QL_{25} | — | August 26, 2004 | Socorro | LINEAR | · | 7.2 km | MPC · JPL |
| 189241 | 2004 RU_{57} | — | September 8, 2004 | Socorro | LINEAR | · | 4.2 km | MPC · JPL |
| 189242 | 2004 RX_{77} | — | September 8, 2004 | Socorro | LINEAR | · | 4.8 km | MPC · JPL |
| 189243 | 2004 RX_{175} | — | September 10, 2004 | Socorro | LINEAR | · | 3.9 km | MPC · JPL |
| 189244 | 2004 RL_{188} | — | September 10, 2004 | Socorro | LINEAR | · | 6.4 km | MPC · JPL |
| 189245 | 2004 RL_{199} | — | September 10, 2004 | Socorro | LINEAR | · | 3.8 km | MPC · JPL |
| 189246 | 2004 RA_{201} | — | September 10, 2004 | Socorro | LINEAR | · | 3.3 km | MPC · JPL |
| 189247 | 2004 RS_{209} | — | September 11, 2004 | Socorro | LINEAR | EUN | 2.1 km | MPC · JPL |
| 189248 | 2004 RH_{290} | — | September 8, 2004 | Socorro | LINEAR | · | 2.6 km | MPC · JPL |
| 189249 | 2004 RG_{307} | — | September 12, 2004 | Palomar | NEAT | · | 5.8 km | MPC · JPL |
| 189250 | 2004 SK_{23} | — | September 17, 2004 | Kitt Peak | Spacewatch | · | 2.8 km | MPC · JPL |
| 189251 | 2004 TN_{8} | — | October 5, 2004 | Haleakala | NEAT | · | 4.4 km | MPC · JPL |
| 189252 | 2004 TW_{19} | — | October 14, 2004 | Goodricke-Pigott | R. A. Tucker | · | 3.2 km | MPC · JPL |
| 189253 | 2004 TL_{100} | — | October 5, 2004 | Palomar | NEAT | ADE | 4.4 km | MPC · JPL |
| 189254 | 2004 TV_{100} | — | October 6, 2004 | Kitt Peak | Spacewatch | KOR | 1.6 km | MPC · JPL |
| 189255 | 2004 TP_{247} | — | October 7, 2004 | Socorro | LINEAR | ADE | 4.5 km | MPC · JPL |
| 189256 | 2004 UV_{4} | — | October 16, 2004 | Socorro | LINEAR | · | 6.8 km | MPC · JPL |
| 189257 | 2004 VO_{48} | — | November 4, 2004 | Kitt Peak | Spacewatch | · | 1.2 km | MPC · JPL |
| 189258 | 2004 VQ_{54} | — | November 9, 2004 | Catalina | CSS | · | 3.7 km | MPC · JPL |
| 189259 | 2004 VR_{77} | — | November 12, 2004 | Catalina | CSS | · | 4.2 km | MPC · JPL |
| 189260 | 2004 WY_{8} | — | November 18, 2004 | Socorro | LINEAR | · | 5.9 km | MPC · JPL |
| 189261 Hiroo | 2004 XO_{62} | Hiroo | December 11, 2004 | Yamagata | K. Itagaki | · | 3.8 km | MPC · JPL |
| 189262 | 2004 XL_{81} | — | December 10, 2004 | Socorro | LINEAR | · | 7.6 km | MPC · JPL |
| 189263 | 2005 CA | — | February 1, 2005 | Socorro | LINEAR | AMO +1km | 2.5 km | MPC · JPL |
| 189264 Gerardjeong | 2005 GY_{108} | Gerardjeong | April 10, 2005 | Mount Lemmon | Mount Lemmon Survey | · | 4.1 km | MPC · JPL |
| 189265 | 2005 GN_{179} | — | April 9, 2005 | Siding Spring | SSS | H | 1.1 km | MPC · JPL |
| 189266 | 2005 QD_{15} | — | August 25, 2005 | Palomar | NEAT | · | 990 m | MPC · JPL |
| 189267 | 2005 QP_{27} | — | August 27, 2005 | Kitt Peak | Spacewatch | · | 2.2 km | MPC · JPL |
| 189268 | 2005 QS_{142} | — | August 31, 2005 | Kitt Peak | Spacewatch | V | 960 m | MPC · JPL |
| 189269 | 2005 QN_{160} | — | August 28, 2005 | Kitt Peak | Spacewatch | V | 890 m | MPC · JPL |
| 189270 | 2005 QM_{175} | — | August 31, 2005 | Kitt Peak | Spacewatch | · | 1.8 km | MPC · JPL |
| 189271 | 2005 RR_{21} | — | September 6, 2005 | Anderson Mesa | LONEOS | NYS | 2.7 km | MPC · JPL |
| 189272 | 2005 RF_{24} | — | September 11, 2005 | Anderson Mesa | LONEOS | (2076) | 1.6 km | MPC · JPL |
| 189273 | 2005 RY_{26} | — | September 9, 2005 | Socorro | LINEAR | · | 2.6 km | MPC · JPL |
| 189274 | 2005 RW_{28} | — | September 12, 2005 | Anderson Mesa | LONEOS | · | 2.5 km | MPC · JPL |
| 189275 | 2005 SZ_{30} | — | September 23, 2005 | Catalina | CSS | · | 1.1 km | MPC · JPL |
| 189276 | 2005 SC_{39} | — | September 24, 2005 | Kitt Peak | Spacewatch | · | 2.5 km | MPC · JPL |
| 189277 | 2005 SD_{120} | — | September 29, 2005 | Kitt Peak | Spacewatch | V | 990 m | MPC · JPL |
| 189278 | 2005 SK_{142} | — | September 25, 2005 | Kitt Peak | Spacewatch | · | 1.8 km | MPC · JPL |
| 189279 | 2005 ST_{173} | — | September 29, 2005 | Anderson Mesa | LONEOS | · | 1.7 km | MPC · JPL |
| 189280 | 2005 SY_{186} | — | September 29, 2005 | Palomar | NEAT | · | 990 m | MPC · JPL |
| 189281 | 2005 SJ_{262} | — | September 23, 2005 | Palomar | NEAT | V | 1.1 km | MPC · JPL |
| 189282 | 2005 TJ_{12} | — | October 1, 2005 | Kitt Peak | Spacewatch | V | 1.0 km | MPC · JPL |
| 189283 | 2005 TX_{14} | — | October 3, 2005 | Palomar | NEAT | · | 2.6 km | MPC · JPL |
| 189284 | 2005 TZ_{28} | — | October 2, 2005 | Anderson Mesa | LONEOS | · | 1.0 km | MPC · JPL |
| 189285 | 2005 TN_{54} | — | October 1, 2005 | Catalina | CSS | · | 1.6 km | MPC · JPL |
| 189286 | 2005 TW_{80} | — | October 3, 2005 | Kitt Peak | Spacewatch | · | 1.4 km | MPC · JPL |
| 189287 | 2005 TR_{172} | — | October 13, 2005 | Socorro | LINEAR | · | 1.3 km | MPC · JPL |
| 189288 | 2005 TB_{194} | — | October 1, 2005 | Kitt Peak | Spacewatch | · | 3.1 km | MPC · JPL |
| 189289 | 2005 UT_{11} | — | October 22, 2005 | Kitt Peak | Spacewatch | HOF | 4.2 km | MPC · JPL |
| 189290 | 2005 UO_{65} | — | October 21, 2005 | Palomar | NEAT | TIR | 4.1 km | MPC · JPL |
| 189291 | 2005 US_{73} | — | October 23, 2005 | Palomar | NEAT | · | 1.1 km | MPC · JPL |
| 189292 | 2005 UB_{87} | — | October 22, 2005 | Kitt Peak | Spacewatch | · | 1.1 km | MPC · JPL |
| 189293 | 2005 UY_{180} | — | October 24, 2005 | Kitt Peak | Spacewatch | · | 1.0 km | MPC · JPL |
| 189294 | 2005 UY_{181} | — | October 24, 2005 | Kitt Peak | Spacewatch | KOR | 1.7 km | MPC · JPL |
| 189295 | 2005 UP_{228} | — | October 25, 2005 | Kitt Peak | Spacewatch | KOR | 1.8 km | MPC · JPL |
| 189296 | 2005 UT_{407} | — | October 30, 2005 | Palomar | NEAT | · | 1.4 km | MPC · JPL |
| 189297 | 2005 UG_{457} | — | October 31, 2005 | Mount Lemmon | Mount Lemmon Survey | · | 2.7 km | MPC · JPL |
| 189298 | 2005 VX_{6} | — | November 8, 2005 | Catalina | CSS | · | 1.3 km | MPC · JPL |
| 189299 | 2005 VO_{120} | — | November 10, 2005 | Mount Lemmon | Mount Lemmon Survey | · | 1.2 km | MPC · JPL |
| 189300 | 2005 VU_{123} | — | November 5, 2005 | Catalina | CSS | · | 3.2 km | MPC · JPL |

== 189301–189400 ==
back to top

| Designation | | | Discovery | | | Properties | | Ref |
| Permanent | Provisional | Named after | Date | Site | Discoverer(s) | Category | Diam. | Ref |
|---|---|---|---|---|---|---|---|---|
| 189301 | 2005 WA_{44} | — | November 21, 2005 | Catalina | CSS | AGN | 1.7 km | MPC · JPL |
| 189302 | 2005 WW_{81} | — | November 28, 2005 | Socorro | LINEAR | · | 1.6 km | MPC · JPL |
| 189303 | 2005 WV_{90} | — | November 28, 2005 | Socorro | LINEAR | · | 3.4 km | MPC · JPL |
| 189304 | 2005 WN_{115} | — | November 29, 2005 | Mount Lemmon | Mount Lemmon Survey | · | 3.7 km | MPC · JPL |
| 189305 | 2005 WT_{190} | — | November 21, 2005 | Anderson Mesa | LONEOS | (194) | 3.9 km | MPC · JPL |
| 189306 | 2005 XO_{29} | — | December 6, 2005 | Catalina | CSS | · | 6.0 km | MPC · JPL |
| 189307 | 2005 YW_{130} | — | December 25, 2005 | Mount Lemmon | Mount Lemmon Survey | AGN | 1.8 km | MPC · JPL |
| 189308 | 2005 YB_{185} | — | December 27, 2005 | Kitt Peak | Spacewatch | · | 2.2 km | MPC · JPL |
| 189309 | 2005 YJ_{213} | — | December 29, 2005 | Socorro | LINEAR | fast | 2.8 km | MPC · JPL |
| 189310 Polydamas | 2006 AJ_{82} | Polydamas | January 3, 2006 | Mérida | Ferrin, I. R. | L5 | 10 km | MPC · JPL |
| 189311 | 2006 BL_{126} | — | January 26, 2006 | Kitt Peak | Spacewatch | · | 1.9 km | MPC · JPL |
| 189312 Jameyszalay | 2006 JN_{62} | Jameyszalay | May 1, 2006 | Kitt Peak | M. W. Buie | THM | 4.5 km | MPC · JPL |
| 189313 | 2006 SA_{73} | — | September 19, 2006 | Kitt Peak | Spacewatch | V | 740 m | MPC · JPL |
| 189314 | 2006 TK_{23} | — | October 11, 2006 | Kitt Peak | Spacewatch | · | 890 m | MPC · JPL |
| 189315 | 2006 UV_{11} | — | October 17, 2006 | Mount Lemmon | Mount Lemmon Survey | · | 2.4 km | MPC · JPL |
| 189316 | 2006 UQ_{336} | — | October 21, 2006 | Mount Lemmon | Mount Lemmon Survey | NYS | 1.9 km | MPC · JPL |
| 189317 | 2006 WE_{88} | — | November 18, 2006 | Mount Lemmon | Mount Lemmon Survey | (5) | 1.6 km | MPC · JPL |
| 189318 | 2006 WM_{201} | — | November 22, 2006 | Mount Lemmon | Mount Lemmon Survey | · | 5.3 km | MPC · JPL |
| 189319 | 2006 XH_{71} | — | December 13, 2006 | Kitt Peak | Spacewatch | ERI | 3.0 km | MPC · JPL |
| 189320 Lakitsferenc | 2006 YC_{14} | Lakitsferenc | December 22, 2006 | Piszkéstető | K. Sárneczky | (2076) | 1.2 km | MPC · JPL |
| 189321 | 2006 YW_{47} | — | December 24, 2006 | Catalina | CSS | EUP | 6.3 km | MPC · JPL |
| 189322 | 2007 AL_{1} | — | January 8, 2007 | Mount Lemmon | Mount Lemmon Survey | · | 2.3 km | MPC · JPL |
| 189323 | 2007 AO_{14} | — | January 9, 2007 | Mount Lemmon | Mount Lemmon Survey | · | 1.3 km | MPC · JPL |
| 189324 | 2007 AN_{28} | — | January 9, 2007 | Kitt Peak | Spacewatch | · | 2.5 km | MPC · JPL |
| 189325 | 2007 AA_{29} | — | January 10, 2007 | Kitt Peak | Spacewatch | · | 2.3 km | MPC · JPL |
| 189326 | 2007 BN_{1} | — | January 16, 2007 | Catalina | CSS | · | 4.1 km | MPC · JPL |
| 189327 | 2007 BP_{68} | — | January 27, 2007 | Mount Lemmon | Mount Lemmon Survey | · | 1.5 km | MPC · JPL |
| 189328 | 2007 CW_{53} | — | February 15, 2007 | Palomar | NEAT | · | 3.4 km | MPC · JPL |
| 189329 | 2007 DU_{46} | — | February 21, 2007 | Socorro | LINEAR | · | 1.7 km | MPC · JPL |
| 189330 | 2007 DS_{56} | — | February 21, 2007 | Mount Lemmon | Mount Lemmon Survey | · | 4.7 km | MPC · JPL |
| 189331 | 2007 DR_{77} | — | February 22, 2007 | Socorro | LINEAR | · | 1.1 km | MPC · JPL |
| 189332 | 2007 EW_{39} | — | March 10, 2007 | Mount Lemmon | Mount Lemmon Survey | · | 1.8 km | MPC · JPL |
| 189333 | 2007 EJ_{79} | — | March 10, 2007 | Kitt Peak | Spacewatch | EMA | 6.2 km | MPC · JPL |
| 189334 | 2007 GM_{56} | — | April 15, 2007 | Kitt Peak | Spacewatch | (5) | 1.8 km | MPC · JPL |
| 189335 | 2007 HS_{61} | — | April 22, 2007 | Catalina | CSS | · | 3.8 km | MPC · JPL |
| 189336 | 2007 TF_{426} | — | October 9, 2007 | Kitt Peak | Spacewatch | · | 2.2 km | MPC · JPL |
| 189337 | 2007 TM_{426} | — | October 9, 2007 | Mount Lemmon | Mount Lemmon Survey | · | 4.1 km | MPC · JPL |
| 189338 | 2007 VZ_{26} | — | November 2, 2007 | Mount Lemmon | Mount Lemmon Survey | · | 2.0 km | MPC · JPL |
| 189339 | 2007 VK_{85} | — | November 2, 2007 | Socorro | LINEAR | · | 2.4 km | MPC · JPL |
| 189340 | 2007 VD_{265} | — | November 13, 2007 | Kitt Peak | Spacewatch | · | 1.1 km | MPC · JPL |
| 189341 | 2007 VJ_{309} | — | November 12, 2007 | Catalina | CSS | · | 4.0 km | MPC · JPL |
| 189342 | 2007 VY_{310} | — | November 8, 2007 | Mount Lemmon | Mount Lemmon Survey | · | 1.8 km | MPC · JPL |
| 189343 | 2007 WW_{57} | — | November 18, 2007 | Kitt Peak | Spacewatch | · | 1.4 km | MPC · JPL |
| 189344 | 2007 XO_{53} | — | December 14, 2007 | Mount Lemmon | Mount Lemmon Survey | · | 3.1 km | MPC · JPL |
| 189345 | 2007 YG_{64} | — | December 31, 2007 | Mount Lemmon | Mount Lemmon Survey | · | 1.6 km | MPC · JPL |
| 189346 | 2008 AP_{114} | — | January 10, 2008 | Kitt Peak | Spacewatch | NYS | 1.6 km | MPC · JPL |
| 189347 Qian | 2008 BQ_{15} | Qian | January 28, 2008 | Lulin Observatory | Q. Ye | EOS | 2.9 km | MPC · JPL |
| 189348 | 2008 BR_{43} | — | January 30, 2008 | Catalina | CSS | · | 1.0 km | MPC · JPL |
| 189349 | 2008 CX_{191} | — | February 2, 2008 | Kitt Peak | Spacewatch | · | 2.3 km | MPC · JPL |
| 189350 | 2008 CJ_{194} | — | February 10, 2008 | Mount Lemmon | Mount Lemmon Survey | · | 2.8 km | MPC · JPL |
| 189351 | 2008 CX_{194} | — | February 13, 2008 | Mount Lemmon | Mount Lemmon Survey | · | 2.1 km | MPC · JPL |
| 189352 | 2008 CS_{196} | — | February 7, 2008 | Mount Lemmon | Mount Lemmon Survey | EOS | 2.4 km | MPC · JPL |
| 189353 | 2008 CG_{198} | — | February 11, 2008 | Mount Lemmon | Mount Lemmon Survey | · | 2.7 km | MPC · JPL |
| 189354 | 2008 DL_{11} | — | February 26, 2008 | Kitt Peak | Spacewatch | · | 1.9 km | MPC · JPL |
| 189355 | 2008 DS_{14} | — | February 26, 2008 | Mount Lemmon | Mount Lemmon Survey | EMA | 5.3 km | MPC · JPL |
| 189356 | 2008 DF_{16} | — | February 27, 2008 | Catalina | CSS | · | 1.8 km | MPC · JPL |
| 189357 | 2008 DF_{38} | — | February 27, 2008 | Kitt Peak | Spacewatch | · | 1.5 km | MPC · JPL |
| 189358 | 2008 DX_{38} | — | February 27, 2008 | Mount Lemmon | Mount Lemmon Survey | · | 2.3 km | MPC · JPL |
| 189359 | 2008 DB_{39} | — | February 27, 2008 | Mount Lemmon | Mount Lemmon Survey | AGN | 1.3 km | MPC · JPL |
| 189360 | 2008 DQ_{39} | — | February 27, 2008 | Mount Lemmon | Mount Lemmon Survey | · | 2.7 km | MPC · JPL |
| 189361 | 2008 DP_{81} | — | February 27, 2008 | Mount Lemmon | Mount Lemmon Survey | · | 1.5 km | MPC · JPL |
| 189362 | 2008 DC_{83} | — | February 28, 2008 | Mount Lemmon | Mount Lemmon Survey | · | 5.2 km | MPC · JPL |
| 189363 | 2008 EV_{35} | — | March 3, 2008 | Kitt Peak | Spacewatch | EOS | 2.4 km | MPC · JPL |
| 189364 | 2008 EM_{112} | — | March 8, 2008 | Kitt Peak | Spacewatch | · | 1.9 km | MPC · JPL |
| 189365 | 2008 EL_{147} | — | March 1, 2008 | Kitt Peak | Spacewatch | · | 2.9 km | MPC · JPL |
| 189366 | 2008 EU_{147} | — | March 1, 2008 | Kitt Peak | Spacewatch | MIS | 3.4 km | MPC · JPL |
| 189367 | 2008 EG_{149} | — | March 4, 2008 | Kitt Peak | Spacewatch | · | 3.2 km | MPC · JPL |
| 189368 | 2008 ER_{149} | — | March 5, 2008 | Kitt Peak | Spacewatch | · | 2.1 km | MPC · JPL |
| 189369 | 2008 EO_{150} | — | March 10, 2008 | Siding Spring | SSS | · | 5.5 km | MPC · JPL |
| 189370 | 2008 EG_{151} | — | March 13, 2008 | Catalina | CSS | · | 1.8 km | MPC · JPL |
| 189371 | 2008 EU_{152} | — | March 11, 2008 | Kitt Peak | Spacewatch | · | 4.0 km | MPC · JPL |
| 189372 | 2008 ES_{153} | — | March 13, 2008 | Catalina | CSS | EOS | 3.1 km | MPC · JPL |
| 189373 | 2008 FG_{26} | — | March 27, 2008 | Mount Lemmon | Mount Lemmon Survey | AGN | 1.6 km | MPC · JPL |
| 189374 | 2008 FQ_{69} | — | March 28, 2008 | Mount Lemmon | Mount Lemmon Survey | · | 1.8 km | MPC · JPL |
| 189375 | 2008 FD_{70} | — | March 28, 2008 | Kitt Peak | Spacewatch | CYB | 4.4 km | MPC · JPL |
| 189376 | 2008 FS_{78} | — | March 27, 2008 | Mount Lemmon | Mount Lemmon Survey | KOR | 1.9 km | MPC · JPL |
| 189377 | 2008 FU_{78} | — | March 27, 2008 | Mount Lemmon | Mount Lemmon Survey | L5 | 13 km | MPC · JPL |
| 189378 | 2008 FL_{102} | — | March 30, 2008 | Kitt Peak | Spacewatch | · | 3.2 km | MPC · JPL |
| 189379 | 2008 FP_{103} | — | March 30, 2008 | Kitt Peak | Spacewatch | · | 2.8 km | MPC · JPL |
| 189380 | 2008 FF_{123} | — | March 28, 2008 | Mount Lemmon | Mount Lemmon Survey | NYS | 1.3 km | MPC · JPL |
| 189381 | 2008 FJ_{126} | — | March 28, 2008 | Mount Lemmon | Mount Lemmon Survey | · | 1.6 km | MPC · JPL |
| 189382 | 2008 GF_{25} | — | April 1, 2008 | Mount Lemmon | Mount Lemmon Survey | · | 3.2 km | MPC · JPL |
| 189383 | 2008 GE_{27} | — | April 3, 2008 | Kitt Peak | Spacewatch | · | 2.1 km | MPC · JPL |
| 189384 | 2008 GN_{38} | — | April 3, 2008 | Mount Lemmon | Mount Lemmon Survey | · | 2.1 km | MPC · JPL |
| 189385 | 2008 GF_{39} | — | April 3, 2008 | Kitt Peak | Spacewatch | · | 2.6 km | MPC · JPL |
| 189386 | 2008 GX_{49} | — | April 5, 2008 | Kitt Peak | Spacewatch | L5 | 14 km | MPC · JPL |
| 189387 | 2008 GL_{83} | — | April 8, 2008 | Kitt Peak | Spacewatch | HOF | 3.9 km | MPC · JPL |
| 189388 | 2008 GY_{96} | — | April 8, 2008 | Kitt Peak | Spacewatch | · | 2.6 km | MPC · JPL |
| 189389 | 2008 GN_{109} | — | April 13, 2008 | Mount Lemmon | Mount Lemmon Survey | EUN | 1.9 km | MPC · JPL |
| 189390 | 2008 GQ_{124} | — | April 14, 2008 | Mount Lemmon | Mount Lemmon Survey | (5) | 1.9 km | MPC · JPL |
| 189391 | 2008 HQ_{12} | — | April 24, 2008 | Kitt Peak | Spacewatch | · | 4.0 km | MPC · JPL |
| 189392 | 2008 HD_{39} | — | April 26, 2008 | Mount Lemmon | Mount Lemmon Survey | · | 3.5 km | MPC · JPL |
| 189393 | 2008 HP_{39} | — | April 26, 2008 | Mount Lemmon | Mount Lemmon Survey | · | 1.4 km | MPC · JPL |
| 189394 | 2008 HU_{44} | — | April 28, 2008 | Kitt Peak | Spacewatch | · | 1.0 km | MPC · JPL |
| 189395 | 2008 HL_{57} | — | April 30, 2008 | Kitt Peak | Spacewatch | · | 3.9 km | MPC · JPL |
| 189396 Sielewicz | 2008 JB_{6} | Sielewicz | May 2, 2008 | Moletai | K. Černis, Zdanavicius, J. | · | 2.8 km | MPC · JPL |
| 189397 | 2008 JM_{18} | — | May 4, 2008 | Kitt Peak | Spacewatch | · | 1.9 km | MPC · JPL |
| 189398 Soemmerring | 2008 JG_{20} | Soemmerring | May 7, 2008 | Taunus | Karge, S., R. Kling | · | 1.8 km | MPC · JPL |
| 189399 | 2008 JV_{21} | — | May 5, 2008 | Mount Lemmon | Mount Lemmon Survey | · | 3.1 km | MPC · JPL |
| 189400 | 2008 JY_{34} | — | May 7, 2008 | Siding Spring | SSS | · | 5.3 km | MPC · JPL |

== 189401–189500 ==
back to top

| Designation | | | Discovery | | | Properties | | Ref |
| Permanent | Provisional | Named after | Date | Site | Discoverer(s) | Category | Diam. | Ref |
|---|---|---|---|---|---|---|---|---|
| 189401 | 2008 KH_{4} | — | May 27, 2008 | Kitt Peak | Spacewatch | EOS | 2.6 km | MPC · JPL |
| 189402 | 2008 KG_{7} | — | May 26, 2008 | Kitt Peak | Spacewatch | BRA | 1.8 km | MPC · JPL |
| 189403 | 2008 KW_{13} | — | May 27, 2008 | Kitt Peak | Spacewatch | · | 4.4 km | MPC · JPL |
| 189404 | 2008 KV_{31} | — | May 29, 2008 | Kitt Peak | Spacewatch | GEF | 1.7 km | MPC · JPL |
| 189405 | 2008 KP_{35} | — | May 27, 2008 | Kitt Peak | Spacewatch | · | 4.3 km | MPC · JPL |
| 189406 | 4835 P-L | — | September 24, 1960 | Palomar | C. J. van Houten, I. van Houten-Groeneveld, T. Gehrels | · | 2.6 km | MPC · JPL |
| 189407 | 3283 T-2 | — | September 30, 1973 | Palomar | C. J. van Houten, I. van Houten-Groeneveld, T. Gehrels | · | 3.6 km | MPC · JPL |
| 189408 | 1989 CA_{3} | — | February 4, 1989 | La Silla | E. W. Elst | LIX | 6.8 km | MPC · JPL |
| 189409 | 1992 SC_{10} | — | September 27, 1992 | Kitt Peak | Spacewatch | THM | 2.8 km | MPC · JPL |
| 189410 | 1993 FO_{51} | — | March 17, 1993 | La Silla | UESAC | · | 3.4 km | MPC · JPL |
| 189411 | 1993 TZ_{26} | — | October 9, 1993 | La Silla | E. W. Elst | NYS | 1.5 km | MPC · JPL |
| 189412 | 1993 TZ_{43} | — | October 10, 1993 | La Silla | H. Debehogne, E. W. Elst | NYS | 1.7 km | MPC · JPL |
| 189413 | 1994 PA_{16} | — | August 10, 1994 | La Silla | E. W. Elst | · | 990 m | MPC · JPL |
| 189414 | 1994 UG_{6} | — | October 28, 1994 | Kitt Peak | Spacewatch | · | 1.7 km | MPC · JPL |
| 189415 | 1995 UF_{18} | — | October 18, 1995 | Kitt Peak | Spacewatch | · | 900 m | MPC · JPL |
| 189416 | 1995 WU_{14} | — | November 17, 1995 | Kitt Peak | Spacewatch | · | 2.9 km | MPC · JPL |
| 189417 | 1996 BG_{10} | — | January 21, 1996 | Kitt Peak | Spacewatch | · | 3.5 km | MPC · JPL |
| 189418 | 1996 EL_{6} | — | March 11, 1996 | Kitt Peak | Spacewatch | · | 2.5 km | MPC · JPL |
| 189419 | 1996 EY_{9} | — | March 12, 1996 | Kitt Peak | Spacewatch | MAS | 1.0 km | MPC · JPL |
| 189420 | 1996 GJ_{10} | — | April 13, 1996 | Kitt Peak | Spacewatch | MAS | 1.0 km | MPC · JPL |
| 189421 | 1997 LK_{5} | — | June 8, 1997 | Kitt Peak | Spacewatch | · | 1.6 km | MPC · JPL |
| 189422 | 1997 OB_{2} | — | July 29, 1997 | Mallorca | Á. López J., R. Pacheco | · | 7.4 km | MPC · JPL |
| 189423 | 1997 PP_{2} | — | August 7, 1997 | Lake Clear | Williams, K. A. | · | 6.7 km | MPC · JPL |
| 189424 | 1997 SK_{2} | — | September 25, 1997 | Kleť | Kleť | · | 2.0 km | MPC · JPL |
| 189425 | 1997 SF_{9} | — | September 27, 1997 | Kitt Peak | Spacewatch | · | 2.1 km | MPC · JPL |
| 189426 | 1997 SF_{33} | — | September 30, 1997 | Kitt Peak | Spacewatch | VER | 6.0 km | MPC · JPL |
| 189427 | 1997 TE_{5} | — | October 1, 1997 | Caussols | ODAS | · | 2.0 km | MPC · JPL |
| 189428 | 1998 HB_{2} | — | April 19, 1998 | Kitt Peak | Spacewatch | · | 850 m | MPC · JPL |
| 189429 | 1998 HS_{118} | — | April 23, 1998 | Socorro | LINEAR | · | 4.5 km | MPC · JPL |
| 189430 | 1998 HH_{145} | — | April 21, 1998 | Socorro | LINEAR | · | 1.1 km | MPC · JPL |
| 189431 | 1998 OV_{5} | — | July 29, 1998 | Caussols | ODAS | · | 1.1 km | MPC · JPL |
| 189432 | 1998 QJ_{29} | — | August 22, 1998 | Xinglong | SCAP | · | 830 m | MPC · JPL |
| 189433 | 1998 QR_{49} | — | August 17, 1998 | Socorro | LINEAR | · | 1.3 km | MPC · JPL |
| 189434 | 1998 QR_{87} | — | August 24, 1998 | Socorro | LINEAR | · | 6.9 km | MPC · JPL |
| 189435 | 1998 QH_{104} | — | August 26, 1998 | La Silla | E. W. Elst | · | 5.2 km | MPC · JPL |
| 189436 | 1998 RN_{42} | — | September 14, 1998 | Socorro | LINEAR | (883) | 1.2 km | MPC · JPL |
| 189437 | 1998 RS_{46} | — | September 14, 1998 | Socorro | LINEAR | · | 1.1 km | MPC · JPL |
| 189438 | 1998 RO_{62} | — | September 14, 1998 | Socorro | LINEAR | · | 2.5 km | MPC · JPL |
| 189439 | 1998 SR_{34} | — | September 26, 1998 | Socorro | LINEAR | · | 1.3 km | MPC · JPL |
| 189440 | 1998 SZ_{42} | — | September 20, 1998 | Xinglong | SCAP | · | 2.9 km | MPC · JPL |
| 189441 | 1998 SG_{84} | — | September 26, 1998 | Socorro | LINEAR | · | 3.1 km | MPC · JPL |
| 189442 | 1998 SP_{93} | — | September 26, 1998 | Socorro | LINEAR | EOS | 3.4 km | MPC · JPL |
| 189443 | 1998 SP_{122} | — | September 26, 1998 | Socorro | LINEAR | · | 1.6 km | MPC · JPL |
| 189444 | 1998 SG_{154} | — | September 26, 1998 | Socorro | LINEAR | · | 1.1 km | MPC · JPL |
| 189445 | 1998 TJ_{7} | — | October 15, 1998 | Catalina | CSS | · | 7.4 km | MPC · JPL |
| 189446 | 1998 VV_{8} | — | November 10, 1998 | Socorro | LINEAR | · | 1.4 km | MPC · JPL |
| 189447 | 1998 WK_{7} | — | November 23, 1998 | Socorro | LINEAR | PHO | 3.2 km | MPC · JPL |
| 189448 | 1998 WV_{27} | — | November 18, 1998 | Kitt Peak | Spacewatch | · | 4.5 km | MPC · JPL |
| 189449 | 1998 XV_{28} | — | December 14, 1998 | Socorro | LINEAR | · | 4.3 km | MPC · JPL |
| 189450 | 1999 BT_{28} | — | January 18, 1999 | Kitt Peak | Spacewatch | · | 1.8 km | MPC · JPL |
| 189451 | 1999 ED | — | March 9, 1999 | Prescott | P. G. Comba | H | 730 m | MPC · JPL |
| 189452 | 1999 EZ_{7} | — | March 12, 1999 | Kitt Peak | Spacewatch | · | 2.1 km | MPC · JPL |
| 189453 | 1999 FX_{96} | — | March 19, 1999 | Kitt Peak | Spacewatch | · | 1.5 km | MPC · JPL |
| 189454 | 1999 JL_{100} | — | May 12, 1999 | Socorro | LINEAR | JUN | 1.9 km | MPC · JPL |
| 189455 | 1999 NH_{57} | — | July 12, 1999 | Socorro | LINEAR | · | 4.1 km | MPC · JPL |
| 189456 | 1999 RX_{3} | — | September 4, 1999 | Catalina | CSS | · | 4.3 km | MPC · JPL |
| 189457 | 1999 RS_{30} | — | September 8, 1999 | Socorro | LINEAR | · | 3.5 km | MPC · JPL |
| 189458 | 1999 RO_{31} | — | September 4, 1999 | Ondřejov | L. Kotková | MRX | 1.7 km | MPC · JPL |
| 189459 | 1999 RC_{85} | — | September 7, 1999 | Socorro | LINEAR | · | 2.4 km | MPC · JPL |
| 189460 | 1999 RQ_{98} | — | September 7, 1999 | Socorro | LINEAR | · | 3.9 km | MPC · JPL |
| 189461 | 1999 RA_{121} | — | September 9, 1999 | Socorro | LINEAR | · | 3.7 km | MPC · JPL |
| 189462 | 1999 RC_{140} | — | September 9, 1999 | Socorro | LINEAR | · | 4.0 km | MPC · JPL |
| 189463 | 1999 RL_{141} | — | September 9, 1999 | Socorro | LINEAR | · | 3.3 km | MPC · JPL |
| 189464 | 1999 RT_{167} | — | September 9, 1999 | Socorro | LINEAR | · | 3.4 km | MPC · JPL |
| 189465 | 1999 RO_{200} | — | September 8, 1999 | Socorro | LINEAR | · | 3.9 km | MPC · JPL |
| 189466 | 1999 RG_{202} | — | September 8, 1999 | Socorro | LINEAR | GEF | 2.9 km | MPC · JPL |
| 189467 | 1999 RO_{219} | — | September 4, 1999 | Catalina | CSS | · | 3.7 km | MPC · JPL |
| 189468 | 1999 RT_{223} | — | September 7, 1999 | Catalina | CSS | GEF | 2.0 km | MPC · JPL |
| 189469 | 1999 SH_{9} | — | September 29, 1999 | Socorro | LINEAR | · | 3.6 km | MPC · JPL |
| 189470 | 1999 TB_{8} | — | October 7, 1999 | Črni Vrh | Mikuž, H. | · | 4.3 km | MPC · JPL |
| 189471 | 1999 TU_{76} | — | October 10, 1999 | Kitt Peak | Spacewatch | · | 1.3 km | MPC · JPL |
| 189472 | 1999 TS_{160} | — | October 9, 1999 | Socorro | LINEAR | · | 3.1 km | MPC · JPL |
| 189473 | 1999 TK_{219} | — | October 1, 1999 | Catalina | CSS | · | 3.2 km | MPC · JPL |
| 189474 | 1999 TP_{219} | — | October 1, 1999 | Catalina | CSS | · | 3.8 km | MPC · JPL |
| 189475 | 1999 TS_{249} | — | October 9, 1999 | Catalina | CSS | · | 4.0 km | MPC · JPL |
| 189476 | 1999 TF_{256} | — | October 9, 1999 | Socorro | LINEAR | · | 3.2 km | MPC · JPL |
| 189477 | 1999 TT_{313} | — | October 8, 1999 | Kitt Peak | Spacewatch | KOR | 1.7 km | MPC · JPL |
| 189478 | 1999 UR_{7} | — | October 29, 1999 | Catalina | CSS | GEF | 2.2 km | MPC · JPL |
| 189479 | 1999 UO_{9} | — | October 31, 1999 | Socorro | LINEAR | · | 6.6 km | MPC · JPL |
| 189480 | 1999 UG_{23} | — | October 28, 1999 | Catalina | CSS | GEF | 2.2 km | MPC · JPL |
| 189481 | 1999 UD_{38} | — | October 17, 1999 | Kitt Peak | Spacewatch | · | 3.1 km | MPC · JPL |
| 189482 | 1999 UT_{47} | — | October 30, 1999 | Catalina | CSS | · | 4.3 km | MPC · JPL |
| 189483 | 1999 VG_{76} | — | November 5, 1999 | Kitt Peak | Spacewatch | KOR | 1.8 km | MPC · JPL |
| 189484 | 1999 VY_{159} | — | November 14, 1999 | Socorro | LINEAR | GEF | 2.1 km | MPC · JPL |
| 189485 | 1999 VY_{164} | — | November 14, 1999 | Socorro | LINEAR | · | 1.5 km | MPC · JPL |
| 189486 | 1999 XS_{8} | — | December 5, 1999 | Socorro | LINEAR | · | 4.6 km | MPC · JPL |
| 189487 | 1999 XM_{79} | — | December 7, 1999 | Socorro | LINEAR | · | 1.9 km | MPC · JPL |
| 189488 | 1999 XS_{106} | — | December 4, 1999 | Catalina | CSS | · | 4.7 km | MPC · JPL |
| 189489 | 1999 XX_{216} | — | December 13, 1999 | Kitt Peak | Spacewatch | · | 3.5 km | MPC · JPL |
| 189490 | 1999 XT_{217} | — | December 13, 1999 | Kitt Peak | Spacewatch | · | 2.2 km | MPC · JPL |
| 189491 | 1999 XY_{224} | — | December 13, 1999 | Kitt Peak | Spacewatch | · | 7.5 km | MPC · JPL |
| 189492 | 1999 XZ_{253} | — | December 12, 1999 | Kitt Peak | Spacewatch | · | 3.6 km | MPC · JPL |
| 189493 | 1999 XL_{257} | — | December 7, 1999 | Socorro | LINEAR | L4 | 20 km | MPC · JPL |
| 189494 | 1999 YY_{3} | — | December 19, 1999 | Socorro | LINEAR | · | 6.7 km | MPC · JPL |
| 189495 | 1999 YO_{6} | — | December 30, 1999 | Socorro | LINEAR | · | 6.3 km | MPC · JPL |
| 189496 | 2000 AW_{36} | — | January 3, 2000 | Socorro | LINEAR | · | 4.5 km | MPC · JPL |
| 189497 | 2000 AQ_{44} | — | January 5, 2000 | Kitt Peak | Spacewatch | · | 4.2 km | MPC · JPL |
| 189498 | 2000 AW_{46} | — | January 4, 2000 | Socorro | LINEAR | EOS | 4.6 km | MPC · JPL |
| 189499 | 2000 AV_{92} | — | January 3, 2000 | Socorro | LINEAR | · | 6.7 km | MPC · JPL |
| 189500 | 2000 AK_{125} | — | January 5, 2000 | Socorro | LINEAR | · | 2.8 km | MPC · JPL |

== 189501–189600 ==
back to top

| Designation | | | Discovery | | | Properties | | Ref |
| Permanent | Provisional | Named after | Date | Site | Discoverer(s) | Category | Diam. | Ref |
|---|---|---|---|---|---|---|---|---|
| 189501 | 2000 AU_{179} | — | January 7, 2000 | Socorro | LINEAR | · | 6.6 km | MPC · JPL |
| 189502 | 2000 AZ_{217} | — | January 8, 2000 | Kitt Peak | Spacewatch | · | 4.9 km | MPC · JPL |
| 189503 | 2000 AH_{228} | — | January 13, 2000 | Kitt Peak | Spacewatch | · | 3.1 km | MPC · JPL |
| 189504 | 2000 CZ_{53} | — | February 2, 2000 | Socorro | LINEAR | HYG | 4.5 km | MPC · JPL |
| 189505 | 2000 CF_{80} | — | February 8, 2000 | Kitt Peak | Spacewatch | · | 1.7 km | MPC · JPL |
| 189506 | 2000 CO_{117} | — | February 2, 2000 | Socorro | LINEAR | · | 3.9 km | MPC · JPL |
| 189507 | 2000 DY_{7} | — | February 28, 2000 | Kitt Peak | Spacewatch | · | 1.2 km | MPC · JPL |
| 189508 | 2000 DL_{14} | — | February 28, 2000 | Kitt Peak | Spacewatch | · | 3.3 km | MPC · JPL |
| 189509 | 2000 DZ_{20} | — | February 29, 2000 | Socorro | LINEAR | · | 3.9 km | MPC · JPL |
| 189510 | 2000 DX_{53} | — | February 29, 2000 | Socorro | LINEAR | · | 1.2 km | MPC · JPL |
| 189511 | 2000 DF_{76} | — | February 29, 2000 | Socorro | LINEAR | HYG | 3.2 km | MPC · JPL |
| 189512 | 2000 ES_{22} | — | March 3, 2000 | Kitt Peak | Spacewatch | · | 5.3 km | MPC · JPL |
| 189513 | 2000 GA_{49} | — | April 5, 2000 | Socorro | LINEAR | · | 1.7 km | MPC · JPL |
| 189514 | 2000 GU_{113} | — | April 7, 2000 | Socorro | LINEAR | · | 3.1 km | MPC · JPL |
| 189515 | 2000 GJ_{130} | — | April 5, 2000 | Kitt Peak | Spacewatch | THB | 6.3 km | MPC · JPL |
| 189516 | 2000 GJ_{155} | — | April 6, 2000 | Anderson Mesa | LONEOS | · | 2.1 km | MPC · JPL |
| 189517 | 2000 HL_{2} | — | April 25, 2000 | Kitt Peak | Spacewatch | NYS | 2.3 km | MPC · JPL |
| 189518 | 2000 HC_{4} | — | April 26, 2000 | Kitt Peak | Spacewatch | MAS | 1.1 km | MPC · JPL |
| 189519 | 2000 HB_{71} | — | April 30, 2000 | Anderson Mesa | LONEOS | · | 2.2 km | MPC · JPL |
| 189520 | 2000 KU_{71} | — | May 28, 2000 | Socorro | LINEAR | · | 3.3 km | MPC · JPL |
| 189521 | 2000 OB_{7} | — | July 30, 2000 | Gnosca | S. Sposetti | H | 1.0 km | MPC · JPL |
| 189522 | 2000 OH_{22} | — | July 30, 2000 | Socorro | LINEAR | H | 1 km | MPC · JPL |
| 189523 | 2000 OM_{31} | — | July 30, 2000 | Socorro | LINEAR | · | 1.9 km | MPC · JPL |
| 189524 | 2000 OV_{34} | — | July 30, 2000 | Socorro | LINEAR | · | 1.6 km | MPC · JPL |
| 189525 | 2000 PT_{3} | — | August 3, 2000 | Socorro | LINEAR | H | 770 m | MPC · JPL |
| 189526 | 2000 PW_{4} | — | August 4, 2000 | Bisei SG Center | BATTeRS | · | 2.1 km | MPC · JPL |
| 189527 | 2000 PX_{6} | — | August 4, 2000 | Socorro | LINEAR | H | 870 m | MPC · JPL |
| 189528 | 2000 QL_{33} | — | August 26, 2000 | Socorro | LINEAR | EUN | 1.9 km | MPC · JPL |
| 189529 | 2000 QA_{34} | — | August 24, 2000 | Socorro | LINEAR | H | 1.1 km | MPC · JPL |
| 189530 | 2000 QH_{58} | — | August 26, 2000 | Socorro | LINEAR | · | 2.1 km | MPC · JPL |
| 189531 | 2000 QV_{70} | — | August 29, 2000 | Socorro | LINEAR | · | 1.9 km | MPC · JPL |
| 189532 | 2000 QK_{78} | — | August 24, 2000 | Socorro | LINEAR | · | 2.0 km | MPC · JPL |
| 189533 | 2000 QZ_{84} | — | August 25, 2000 | Socorro | LINEAR | · | 2.2 km | MPC · JPL |
| 189534 | 2000 QH_{92} | — | August 25, 2000 | Socorro | LINEAR | (5) | 2.9 km | MPC · JPL |
| 189535 | 2000 QS_{94} | — | August 26, 2000 | Socorro | LINEAR | · | 2.1 km | MPC · JPL |
| 189536 | 2000 QF_{95} | — | August 26, 2000 | Socorro | LINEAR | · | 1.5 km | MPC · JPL |
| 189537 | 2000 QX_{108} | — | August 29, 2000 | Socorro | LINEAR | · | 1.9 km | MPC · JPL |
| 189538 | 2000 QK_{118} | — | August 25, 2000 | Socorro | LINEAR | EUN | 1.5 km | MPC · JPL |
| 189539 | 2000 QG_{130} | — | August 31, 2000 | Socorro | LINEAR | · | 5.1 km | MPC · JPL |
| 189540 | 2000 QZ_{164} | — | August 31, 2000 | Socorro | LINEAR | · | 2.1 km | MPC · JPL |
| 189541 | 2000 QJ_{173} | — | August 31, 2000 | Socorro | LINEAR | · | 2.2 km | MPC · JPL |
| 189542 | 2000 QM_{218} | — | August 20, 2000 | Kitt Peak | Spacewatch | · | 1.5 km | MPC · JPL |
| 189543 | 2000 RH | — | September 1, 2000 | Socorro | LINEAR | H | 1.2 km | MPC · JPL |
| 189544 | 2000 RV_{11} | — | September 3, 2000 | Socorro | LINEAR | H | 920 m | MPC · JPL |
| 189545 | 2000 RT_{36} | — | September 2, 2000 | Socorro | LINEAR | · | 2.0 km | MPC · JPL |
| 189546 | 2000 RW_{36} | — | September 2, 2000 | Socorro | LINEAR | · | 1.6 km | MPC · JPL |
| 189547 | 2000 RN_{44} | — | September 3, 2000 | Socorro | LINEAR | · | 2.7 km | MPC · JPL |
| 189548 | 2000 RJ_{47} | — | September 3, 2000 | Socorro | LINEAR | · | 1.9 km | MPC · JPL |
| 189549 | 2000 RA_{67} | — | September 1, 2000 | Socorro | LINEAR | · | 2.3 km | MPC · JPL |
| 189550 | 2000 RD_{70} | — | September 2, 2000 | Socorro | LINEAR | EUN | 2.1 km | MPC · JPL |
| 189551 | 2000 RF_{74} | — | September 2, 2000 | Socorro | LINEAR | · | 2.0 km | MPC · JPL |
| 189552 | 2000 RL_{77} | — | September 6, 2000 | Socorro | LINEAR | AMO +1km | 1.5 km | MPC · JPL |
| 189553 | 2000 ST_{2} | — | September 20, 2000 | Haleakala | NEAT | · | 2.8 km | MPC · JPL |
| 189554 | 2000 SO_{26} | — | September 23, 2000 | Socorro | LINEAR | · | 2.6 km | MPC · JPL |
| 189555 | 2000 SY_{37} | — | September 24, 2000 | Socorro | LINEAR | (5) | 1.8 km | MPC · JPL |
| 189556 | 2000 SQ_{47} | — | September 23, 2000 | Socorro | LINEAR | · | 5.0 km | MPC · JPL |
| 189557 | 2000 SU_{76} | — | September 24, 2000 | Socorro | LINEAR | · | 1.8 km | MPC · JPL |
| 189558 | 2000 SL_{81} | — | September 24, 2000 | Socorro | LINEAR | · | 2.2 km | MPC · JPL |
| 189559 | 2000 SY_{90} | — | September 22, 2000 | Socorro | LINEAR | MAR | 1.5 km | MPC · JPL |
| 189560 | 2000 SW_{92} | — | September 23, 2000 | Socorro | LINEAR | · | 2.2 km | MPC · JPL |
| 189561 | 2000 SN_{115} | — | September 24, 2000 | Socorro | LINEAR | · | 1.9 km | MPC · JPL |
| 189562 | 2000 SX_{212} | — | September 25, 2000 | Socorro | LINEAR | · | 1.8 km | MPC · JPL |
| 189563 | 2000 SG_{222} | — | September 26, 2000 | Socorro | LINEAR | · | 4.2 km | MPC · JPL |
| 189564 | 2000 SG_{245} | — | September 24, 2000 | Socorro | LINEAR | · | 1.9 km | MPC · JPL |
| 189565 | 2000 SG_{273} | — | September 28, 2000 | Socorro | LINEAR | · | 2.6 km | MPC · JPL |
| 189566 | 2000 SQ_{278} | — | September 30, 2000 | Socorro | LINEAR | (5) | 1.9 km | MPC · JPL |
| 189567 | 2000 SW_{310} | — | September 26, 2000 | Socorro | LINEAR | · | 3.0 km | MPC · JPL |
| 189568 | 2000 SN_{311} | — | September 27, 2000 | Socorro | LINEAR | · | 2.2 km | MPC · JPL |
| 189569 | 2000 SQ_{312} | — | September 27, 2000 | Socorro | LINEAR | EUN | 1.5 km | MPC · JPL |
| 189570 | 2000 SW_{316} | — | September 30, 2000 | Socorro | LINEAR | · | 2.3 km | MPC · JPL |
| 189571 | 2000 SX_{317} | — | September 30, 2000 | Socorro | LINEAR | · | 4.1 km | MPC · JPL |
| 189572 | 2000 SV_{351} | — | September 29, 2000 | Anderson Mesa | LONEOS | H | 990 m | MPC · JPL |
| 189573 | 2000 TV_{23} | — | October 2, 2000 | Socorro | LINEAR | · | 1.9 km | MPC · JPL |
| 189574 | 2000 TT_{43} | — | October 1, 2000 | Socorro | LINEAR | · | 1.9 km | MPC · JPL |
| 189575 | 2000 UG_{14} | — | October 24, 2000 | Socorro | LINEAR | · | 2.2 km | MPC · JPL |
| 189576 | 2000 UT_{29} | — | October 25, 2000 | Socorro | LINEAR | · | 3.2 km | MPC · JPL |
| 189577 | 2000 UR_{42} | — | October 24, 2000 | Socorro | LINEAR | · | 3.3 km | MPC · JPL |
| 189578 | 2000 US_{60} | — | October 25, 2000 | Socorro | LINEAR | · | 2.3 km | MPC · JPL |
| 189579 | 2000 UC_{68} | — | October 25, 2000 | Socorro | LINEAR | HNS | 2.3 km | MPC · JPL |
| 189580 | 2000 UX_{69} | — | October 25, 2000 | Socorro | LINEAR | · | 1.8 km | MPC · JPL |
| 189581 | 2000 UL_{76} | — | October 30, 2000 | Socorro | LINEAR | · | 2.0 km | MPC · JPL |
| 189582 | 2000 VC_{14} | — | November 1, 2000 | Socorro | LINEAR | (5) | 1.6 km | MPC · JPL |
| 189583 | 2000 VT_{34} | — | November 1, 2000 | Socorro | LINEAR | · | 1.8 km | MPC · JPL |
| 189584 | 2000 VR_{54} | — | November 3, 2000 | Socorro | LINEAR | (5) | 2.1 km | MPC · JPL |
| 189585 | 2000 VW_{54} | — | November 3, 2000 | Socorro | LINEAR | · | 2.4 km | MPC · JPL |
| 189586 | 2000 WC_{5} | — | November 19, 2000 | Socorro | LINEAR | RAF | 1.7 km | MPC · JPL |
| 189587 | 2000 WR_{7} | — | November 20, 2000 | Socorro | LINEAR | · | 2.1 km | MPC · JPL |
| 189588 | 2000 WY_{7} | — | November 20, 2000 | Socorro | LINEAR | · | 1.8 km | MPC · JPL |
| 189589 | 2000 WO_{16} | — | November 21, 2000 | Socorro | LINEAR | (5) | 2.8 km | MPC · JPL |
| 189590 | 2000 WP_{24} | — | November 20, 2000 | Socorro | LINEAR | (5) | 2.3 km | MPC · JPL |
| 189591 | 2000 WY_{37} | — | November 20, 2000 | Socorro | LINEAR | · | 2.2 km | MPC · JPL |
| 189592 | 2000 WP_{39} | — | November 20, 2000 | Socorro | LINEAR | · | 1.8 km | MPC · JPL |
| 189593 | 2000 WL_{73} | — | November 20, 2000 | Socorro | LINEAR | · | 3.5 km | MPC · JPL |
| 189594 | 2000 WG_{79} | — | November 20, 2000 | Socorro | LINEAR | · | 1.7 km | MPC · JPL |
| 189595 | 2000 WU_{86} | — | November 20, 2000 | Socorro | LINEAR | MRX | 1.8 km | MPC · JPL |
| 189596 | 2000 WR_{98} | — | November 21, 2000 | Socorro | LINEAR | · | 5.9 km | MPC · JPL |
| 189597 | 2000 WG_{119} | — | November 20, 2000 | Socorro | LINEAR | · | 3.5 km | MPC · JPL |
| 189598 | 2000 WG_{120} | — | November 20, 2000 | Socorro | LINEAR | · | 2.8 km | MPC · JPL |
| 189599 | 2000 WD_{126} | — | November 30, 2000 | Socorro | LINEAR | · | 2.4 km | MPC · JPL |
| 189600 | 2000 WE_{139} | — | November 21, 2000 | Socorro | LINEAR | · | 3.7 km | MPC · JPL |

== 189601–189700 ==
back to top

| Designation | | | Discovery | | | Properties | | Ref |
| Permanent | Provisional | Named after | Date | Site | Discoverer(s) | Category | Diam. | Ref |
|---|---|---|---|---|---|---|---|---|
| 189601 | 2000 WR_{155} | — | November 30, 2000 | Socorro | LINEAR | · | 2.5 km | MPC · JPL |
| 189602 | 2000 XC_{2} | — | December 1, 2000 | Socorro | LINEAR | HNS | 3.2 km | MPC · JPL |
| 189603 | 2000 XN_{5} | — | December 1, 2000 | Socorro | LINEAR | · | 2.6 km | MPC · JPL |
| 189604 | 2000 XE_{17} | — | December 1, 2000 | Socorro | LINEAR | · | 3.2 km | MPC · JPL |
| 189605 | 2000 XG_{23} | — | December 4, 2000 | Socorro | LINEAR | ADE | 3.5 km | MPC · JPL |
| 189606 | 2000 XV_{31} | — | December 4, 2000 | Socorro | LINEAR | RAF | 1.9 km | MPC · JPL |
| 189607 | 2000 XR_{36} | — | December 5, 2000 | Socorro | LINEAR | EUN · slow | 3.5 km | MPC · JPL |
| 189608 | 2000 XX_{36} | — | December 5, 2000 | Socorro | LINEAR | EUN | 2.4 km | MPC · JPL |
| 189609 | 2000 XX_{39} | — | December 5, 2000 | Socorro | LINEAR | · | 3.4 km | MPC · JPL |
| 189610 | 2000 YE_{44} | — | December 30, 2000 | Socorro | LINEAR | · | 3.6 km | MPC · JPL |
| 189611 | 2000 YE_{49} | — | December 30, 2000 | Socorro | LINEAR | · | 4.2 km | MPC · JPL |
| 189612 | 2000 YM_{97} | — | December 30, 2000 | Socorro | LINEAR | · | 4.7 km | MPC · JPL |
| 189613 | 2000 YD_{100} | — | December 25, 2000 | Haleakala | NEAT | · | 2.6 km | MPC · JPL |
| 189614 | 2000 YV_{143} | — | December 19, 2000 | Haleakala | NEAT | · | 3.6 km | MPC · JPL |
| 189615 | 2001 AF_{25} | — | January 4, 2001 | Socorro | LINEAR | (5) | 2.9 km | MPC · JPL |
| 189616 | 2001 BQ_{17} | — | January 19, 2001 | Socorro | LINEAR | L4 | 10 km | MPC · JPL |
| 189617 | 2001 BV_{23} | — | January 20, 2001 | Socorro | LINEAR | · | 5.0 km | MPC · JPL |
| 189618 | 2001 BD_{41} | — | January 24, 2001 | Socorro | LINEAR | · | 6.3 km | MPC · JPL |
| 189619 | 2001 BW_{57} | — | January 29, 2001 | Oaxaca | Roe, J. M. | AGN | 2.2 km | MPC · JPL |
| 189620 | 2001 BH_{63} | — | January 29, 2001 | Socorro | LINEAR | DOR | 5.0 km | MPC · JPL |
| 189621 | 2001 CL_{6} | — | February 1, 2001 | Socorro | LINEAR | · | 3.2 km | MPC · JPL |
| 189622 | 2001 DZ_{52} | — | February 17, 2001 | Socorro | LINEAR | · | 6.2 km | MPC · JPL |
| 189623 | 2001 DK_{63} | — | February 19, 2001 | Socorro | LINEAR | · | 3.9 km | MPC · JPL |
| 189624 | 2001 DF_{82} | — | February 22, 2001 | Kitt Peak | Spacewatch | · | 3.3 km | MPC · JPL |
| 189625 | 2001 FX_{107} | — | March 18, 2001 | Anderson Mesa | LONEOS | · | 4.9 km | MPC · JPL |
| 189626 | 2001 HV_{25} | — | April 26, 2001 | Kitt Peak | Spacewatch | · | 1.1 km | MPC · JPL |
| 189627 | 2001 HJ_{54} | — | April 24, 2001 | Socorro | LINEAR | · | 6.3 km | MPC · JPL |
| 189628 | 2001 KE_{4} | — | May 17, 2001 | Socorro | LINEAR | · | 8.5 km | MPC · JPL |
| 189629 | 2001 KH_{43} | — | May 22, 2001 | Socorro | LINEAR | · | 1.2 km | MPC · JPL |
| 189630 | 2001 LE_{6} | — | June 15, 2001 | Palomar | NEAT | APO +1km | 970 m | MPC · JPL |
| 189631 | 2001 LX_{8} | — | June 15, 2001 | Socorro | LINEAR | · | 1.0 km | MPC · JPL |
| 189632 | 2001 NK_{5} | — | July 13, 2001 | Palomar | NEAT | · | 900 m | MPC · JPL |
| 189633 | 2001 OW_{6} | — | July 17, 2001 | Anderson Mesa | LONEOS | · | 1.6 km | MPC · JPL |
| 189634 | 2001 OV_{14} | — | July 20, 2001 | Socorro | LINEAR | PHO | 1.7 km | MPC · JPL |
| 189635 | 2001 OW_{18} | — | July 17, 2001 | Haleakala | NEAT | · | 1.3 km | MPC · JPL |
| 189636 | 2001 OY_{18} | — | July 17, 2001 | Haleakala | NEAT | · | 1.2 km | MPC · JPL |
| 189637 | 2001 OT_{20} | — | July 21, 2001 | Anderson Mesa | LONEOS | · | 2.5 km | MPC · JPL |
| 189638 | 2001 OP_{21} | — | July 21, 2001 | Anderson Mesa | LONEOS | · | 2.1 km | MPC · JPL |
| 189639 | 2001 OA_{25} | — | July 16, 2001 | Haleakala | NEAT | · | 2.5 km | MPC · JPL |
| 189640 | 2001 OO_{47} | — | July 16, 2001 | Anderson Mesa | LONEOS | · | 1.5 km | MPC · JPL |
| 189641 | 2001 OW_{48} | — | July 16, 2001 | Haleakala | NEAT | · | 1.3 km | MPC · JPL |
| 189642 | 2001 OA_{66} | — | July 22, 2001 | Socorro | LINEAR | V | 1.1 km | MPC · JPL |
| 189643 | 2001 OH_{70} | — | July 19, 2001 | Anderson Mesa | LONEOS | · | 1.7 km | MPC · JPL |
| 189644 | 2001 OM_{70} | — | July 19, 2001 | Anderson Mesa | LONEOS | · | 1.3 km | MPC · JPL |
| 189645 | 2001 OQ_{85} | — | July 20, 2001 | Socorro | LINEAR | · | 1.3 km | MPC · JPL |
| 189646 | 2001 OB_{91} | — | July 25, 2001 | Haleakala | NEAT | · | 1.1 km | MPC · JPL |
| 189647 | 2001 OB_{97} | — | July 25, 2001 | Haleakala | NEAT | · | 1.9 km | MPC · JPL |
| 189648 | 2001 OV_{102} | — | July 29, 2001 | Anderson Mesa | LONEOS | PHO | 1.7 km | MPC · JPL |
| 189649 | 2001 OS_{106} | — | July 29, 2001 | Socorro | LINEAR | · | 2.6 km | MPC · JPL |
| 189650 | 2001 OA_{107} | — | July 29, 2001 | Socorro | LINEAR | V | 1.4 km | MPC · JPL |
| 189651 | 2001 PU_{4} | — | August 6, 2001 | Haleakala | NEAT | · | 2.2 km | MPC · JPL |
| 189652 | 2001 PE_{26} | — | August 11, 2001 | Haleakala | NEAT | NYS | 1.2 km | MPC · JPL |
| 189653 | 2001 PR_{52} | — | August 15, 2001 | Haleakala | NEAT | · | 2.3 km | MPC · JPL |
| 189654 | 2001 QB_{11} | — | August 16, 2001 | Socorro | LINEAR | PHO | 2.6 km | MPC · JPL |
| 189655 | 2001 QK_{36} | — | August 16, 2001 | Socorro | LINEAR | · | 1.4 km | MPC · JPL |
| 189656 | 2001 QZ_{50} | — | August 16, 2001 | Socorro | LINEAR | · | 1.3 km | MPC · JPL |
| 189657 | 2001 QB_{54} | — | August 16, 2001 | Socorro | LINEAR | · | 1.8 km | MPC · JPL |
| 189658 | 2001 QQ_{97} | — | August 17, 2001 | Socorro | LINEAR | · | 1.7 km | MPC · JPL |
| 189659 | 2001 QG_{115} | — | August 17, 2001 | Socorro | LINEAR | · | 2.1 km | MPC · JPL |
| 189660 | 2001 QV_{135} | — | August 22, 2001 | Socorro | LINEAR | V | 1.5 km | MPC · JPL |
| 189661 | 2001 QL_{155} | — | August 23, 2001 | Anderson Mesa | LONEOS | · | 1.4 km | MPC · JPL |
| 189662 | 2001 QR_{170} | — | August 24, 2001 | Socorro | LINEAR | · | 2.6 km | MPC · JPL |
| 189663 | 2001 QO_{188} | — | August 22, 2001 | Kitt Peak | Spacewatch | · | 1.2 km | MPC · JPL |
| 189664 | 2001 QW_{233} | — | August 24, 2001 | Socorro | LINEAR | · | 2.4 km | MPC · JPL |
| 189665 | 2001 RY_{6} | — | September 10, 2001 | Desert Eagle | W. K. Y. Yeung | MAS | 1.2 km | MPC · JPL |
| 189666 | 2001 RF_{50} | — | September 10, 2001 | Socorro | LINEAR | · | 1.9 km | MPC · JPL |
| 189667 | 2001 RN_{64} | — | September 10, 2001 | Socorro | LINEAR | · | 2.3 km | MPC · JPL |
| 189668 | 2001 RJ_{80} | — | September 12, 2001 | Palomar | NEAT | · | 1.8 km | MPC · JPL |
| 189669 | 2001 RK_{83} | — | September 11, 2001 | Anderson Mesa | LONEOS | · | 1.7 km | MPC · JPL |
| 189670 | 2001 RB_{100} | — | September 12, 2001 | Socorro | LINEAR | V | 910 m | MPC · JPL |
| 189671 | 2001 RW_{129} | — | September 12, 2001 | Socorro | LINEAR | NYS | 1.4 km | MPC · JPL |
| 189672 | 2001 RT_{136} | — | September 12, 2001 | Socorro | LINEAR | · | 1.5 km | MPC · JPL |
| 189673 | 2001 RK_{155} | — | September 12, 2001 | Socorro | LINEAR | · | 2.0 km | MPC · JPL |
| 189674 | 2001 SN_{22} | — | September 16, 2001 | Socorro | LINEAR | · | 2.0 km | MPC · JPL |
| 189675 | 2001 SF_{28} | — | September 16, 2001 | Socorro | LINEAR | MAS | 930 m | MPC · JPL |
| 189676 | 2001 SC_{35} | — | September 16, 2001 | Socorro | LINEAR | · | 1.9 km | MPC · JPL |
| 189677 | 2001 SU_{39} | — | September 16, 2001 | Socorro | LINEAR | NYS | 1.9 km | MPC · JPL |
| 189678 | 2001 SM_{46} | — | September 16, 2001 | Socorro | LINEAR | V | 1.1 km | MPC · JPL |
| 189679 | 2001 SP_{47} | — | September 16, 2001 | Socorro | LINEAR | · | 1.7 km | MPC · JPL |
| 189680 | 2001 SX_{70} | — | September 17, 2001 | Socorro | LINEAR | · | 2.5 km | MPC · JPL |
| 189681 | 2001 SV_{82} | — | September 20, 2001 | Socorro | LINEAR | · | 1.2 km | MPC · JPL |
| 189682 | 2001 SV_{83} | — | September 20, 2001 | Socorro | LINEAR | V | 1.0 km | MPC · JPL |
| 189683 | 2001 SR_{99} | — | September 20, 2001 | Socorro | LINEAR | · | 1.3 km | MPC · JPL |
| 189684 | 2001 SY_{110} | — | September 20, 2001 | Socorro | LINEAR | ERI | 3.1 km | MPC · JPL |
| 189685 | 2001 SY_{113} | — | September 20, 2001 | Desert Eagle | W. K. Y. Yeung | · | 2.1 km | MPC · JPL |
| 189686 | 2001 SB_{128} | — | September 16, 2001 | Socorro | LINEAR | MAS | 900 m | MPC · JPL |
| 189687 | 2001 SC_{144} | — | September 16, 2001 | Socorro | LINEAR | V | 850 m | MPC · JPL |
| 189688 | 2001 SU_{160} | — | September 17, 2001 | Socorro | LINEAR | · | 2.1 km | MPC · JPL |
| 189689 | 2001 SN_{222} | — | September 19, 2001 | Socorro | LINEAR | · | 1.6 km | MPC · JPL |
| 189690 | 2001 SY_{227} | — | September 19, 2001 | Socorro | LINEAR | MAS | 830 m | MPC · JPL |
| 189691 | 2001 SU_{258} | — | September 20, 2001 | Socorro | LINEAR | · | 2.1 km | MPC · JPL |
| 189692 | 2001 SR_{260} | — | September 20, 2001 | Socorro | LINEAR | · | 1.6 km | MPC · JPL |
| 189693 | 2001 SO_{270} | — | September 27, 2001 | Fountain Hills | C. W. Juels, P. R. Holvorcem | PHO | 4.1 km | MPC · JPL |
| 189694 | 2001 SF_{276} | — | September 27, 2001 | Socorro | LINEAR | · | 2.0 km | MPC · JPL |
| 189695 | 2001 SH_{278} | — | September 21, 2001 | Anderson Mesa | LONEOS | · | 2.2 km | MPC · JPL |
| 189696 | 2001 SQ_{280} | — | September 21, 2001 | Anderson Mesa | LONEOS | NYS | 2.1 km | MPC · JPL |
| 189697 | 2001 TY_{3} | — | October 7, 2001 | Palomar | NEAT | NYS | 1.2 km | MPC · JPL |
| 189698 | 2001 TG_{24} | — | October 14, 2001 | Socorro | LINEAR | NYS | 1.7 km | MPC · JPL |
| 189699 | 2001 TK_{29} | — | October 14, 2001 | Socorro | LINEAR | · | 1.5 km | MPC · JPL |
| 189700 | 2001 TA_{45} | — | October 14, 2001 | Socorro | LINEAR | AMO | 530 m | MPC · JPL |

== 189701–189800 ==
back to top

| Designation | | | Discovery | | | Properties | | Ref |
| Permanent | Provisional | Named after | Date | Site | Discoverer(s) | Category | Diam. | Ref |
|---|---|---|---|---|---|---|---|---|
| 189701 | 2001 TX_{52} | — | October 13, 2001 | Socorro | LINEAR | NYS | 1.8 km | MPC · JPL |
| 189702 | 2001 TQ_{85} | — | October 14, 2001 | Socorro | LINEAR | T_{j} (2.99) · HIL · 3:2 | 7.8 km | MPC · JPL |
| 189703 | 2001 TS_{96} | — | October 14, 2001 | Socorro | LINEAR | NYS | 1.6 km | MPC · JPL |
| 189704 | 2001 TN_{110} | — | October 14, 2001 | Socorro | LINEAR | · | 1.7 km | MPC · JPL |
| 189705 | 2001 TP_{122} | — | October 15, 2001 | Socorro | LINEAR | · | 2.7 km | MPC · JPL |
| 189706 | 2001 TE_{134} | — | October 12, 2001 | Haleakala | NEAT | · | 1.7 km | MPC · JPL |
| 189707 | 2001 TD_{148} | — | October 10, 2001 | Palomar | NEAT | fast | 2.1 km | MPC · JPL |
| 189708 | 2001 TH_{149} | — | October 10, 2001 | Palomar | NEAT | · | 2.1 km | MPC · JPL |
| 189709 | 2001 TC_{158} | — | October 10, 2001 | Palomar | NEAT | · | 1.8 km | MPC · JPL |
| 189710 | 2001 TH_{168} | — | October 15, 2001 | Socorro | LINEAR | · | 1.7 km | MPC · JPL |
| 189711 | 2001 TT_{173} | — | October 14, 2001 | Socorro | LINEAR | MAS | 870 m | MPC · JPL |
| 189712 | 2001 TE_{183} | — | October 14, 2001 | Socorro | LINEAR | · | 2.6 km | MPC · JPL |
| 189713 | 2001 TD_{198} | — | October 11, 2001 | Eskridge | Farpoint | V | 930 m | MPC · JPL |
| 189714 | 2001 TL_{229} | — | October 15, 2001 | Palomar | NEAT | HIL · 3:2 | 10 km | MPC · JPL |
| 189715 | 2001 UX_{12} | — | October 24, 2001 | Desert Eagle | W. K. Y. Yeung | MAS | 1.4 km | MPC · JPL |
| 189716 | 2001 UT_{14} | — | October 24, 2001 | Desert Eagle | W. K. Y. Yeung | · | 2.2 km | MPC · JPL |
| 189717 | 2001 UD_{41} | — | October 17, 2001 | Socorro | LINEAR | NYS | 1.6 km | MPC · JPL |
| 189718 | 2001 UV_{46} | — | October 17, 2001 | Socorro | LINEAR | NYS | 1.8 km | MPC · JPL |
| 189719 | 2001 UW_{96} | — | October 17, 2001 | Socorro | LINEAR | · | 1.4 km | MPC · JPL |
| 189720 | 2001 UA_{155} | — | October 23, 2001 | Socorro | LINEAR | · | 2.6 km | MPC · JPL |
| 189721 | 2001 UL_{158} | — | October 23, 2001 | Socorro | LINEAR | · | 1.6 km | MPC · JPL |
| 189722 | 2001 UN_{167} | — | October 19, 2001 | Socorro | LINEAR | PHO | 1.6 km | MPC · JPL |
| 189723 | 2001 UB_{178} | — | October 24, 2001 | Socorro | LINEAR | · | 2.6 km | MPC · JPL |
| 189724 | 2001 VA_{13} | — | November 10, 2001 | Socorro | LINEAR | · | 4.3 km | MPC · JPL |
| 189725 | 2001 VB_{30} | — | November 9, 2001 | Socorro | LINEAR | NYS | 2.1 km | MPC · JPL |
| 189726 | 2001 VD_{55} | — | November 10, 2001 | Socorro | LINEAR | V | 1.3 km | MPC · JPL |
| 189727 | 2001 VJ_{77} | — | November 9, 2001 | Palomar | NEAT | · | 2.8 km | MPC · JPL |
| 189728 | 2001 VW_{110} | — | November 12, 2001 | Socorro | LINEAR | · | 1.9 km | MPC · JPL |
| 189729 | 2001 WV_{8} | — | November 17, 2001 | Socorro | LINEAR | · | 2.8 km | MPC · JPL |
| 189730 | 2001 WW_{11} | — | November 17, 2001 | Socorro | LINEAR | · | 2.4 km | MPC · JPL |
| 189731 | 2001 WE_{47} | — | November 16, 2001 | Palomar | NEAT | · | 3.4 km | MPC · JPL |
| 189732 | 2001 WG_{60} | — | November 19, 2001 | Socorro | LINEAR | · | 1.9 km | MPC · JPL |
| 189733 | 2001 XU_{2} | — | December 8, 2001 | Socorro | LINEAR | PHO | 6.2 km | MPC · JPL |
| 189734 | 2001 XV_{16} | — | December 9, 2001 | Socorro | LINEAR | · | 2.0 km | MPC · JPL |
| 189735 | 2001 XJ_{55} | — | December 10, 2001 | Socorro | LINEAR | · | 1.9 km | MPC · JPL |
| 189736 | 2001 XP_{55} | — | December 10, 2001 | Socorro | LINEAR | · | 2.5 km | MPC · JPL |
| 189737 | 2001 XA_{71} | — | December 11, 2001 | Socorro | LINEAR | NYS | 2.2 km | MPC · JPL |
| 189738 | 2001 XO_{71} | — | December 11, 2001 | Socorro | LINEAR | V | 1.1 km | MPC · JPL |
| 189739 | 2001 XV_{75} | — | December 11, 2001 | Socorro | LINEAR | NYS | 1.6 km | MPC · JPL |
| 189740 | 2001 XA_{80} | — | December 11, 2001 | Socorro | LINEAR | V | 1.2 km | MPC · JPL |
| 189741 | 2001 XG_{97} | — | December 10, 2001 | Socorro | LINEAR | · | 1.8 km | MPC · JPL |
| 189742 | 2001 XM_{120} | — | December 14, 2001 | Socorro | LINEAR | · | 2.2 km | MPC · JPL |
| 189743 | 2001 XZ_{134} | — | December 14, 2001 | Socorro | LINEAR | · | 1.5 km | MPC · JPL |
| 189744 | 2001 XF_{199} | — | December 14, 2001 | Socorro | LINEAR | · | 3.5 km | MPC · JPL |
| 189745 | 2001 XR_{240} | — | December 15, 2001 | Socorro | LINEAR | · | 3.0 km | MPC · JPL |
| 189746 | 2001 YV_{41} | — | December 18, 2001 | Socorro | LINEAR | · | 2.9 km | MPC · JPL |
| 189747 | 2001 YM_{45} | — | December 18, 2001 | Socorro | LINEAR | · | 2.8 km | MPC · JPL |
| 189748 | 2001 YR_{52} | — | December 18, 2001 | Socorro | LINEAR | · | 2.4 km | MPC · JPL |
| 189749 | 2001 YS_{84} | — | December 18, 2001 | Socorro | LINEAR | · | 3.5 km | MPC · JPL |
| 189750 | 2001 YT_{109} | — | December 18, 2001 | Socorro | LINEAR | NYS | 2.1 km | MPC · JPL |
| 189751 | 2001 YJ_{121} | — | December 17, 2001 | Socorro | LINEAR | · | 2.7 km | MPC · JPL |
| 189752 | 2001 YB_{125} | — | December 17, 2001 | Socorro | LINEAR | · | 2.4 km | MPC · JPL |
| 189753 | 2001 YS_{127} | — | December 17, 2001 | Socorro | LINEAR | · | 3.5 km | MPC · JPL |
| 189754 | 2002 AB_{42} | — | January 9, 2002 | Socorro | LINEAR | · | 2.5 km | MPC · JPL |
| 189755 | 2002 AM_{43} | — | January 9, 2002 | Socorro | LINEAR | · | 4.1 km | MPC · JPL |
| 189756 | 2002 AN_{53} | — | January 9, 2002 | Socorro | LINEAR | HNS | 2.9 km | MPC · JPL |
| 189757 | 2002 AE_{82} | — | January 9, 2002 | Socorro | LINEAR | · | 2.0 km | MPC · JPL |
| 189758 | 2002 AA_{98} | — | January 8, 2002 | Socorro | LINEAR | · | 2.0 km | MPC · JPL |
| 189759 | 2002 AT_{133} | — | January 9, 2002 | Socorro | LINEAR | · | 2.5 km | MPC · JPL |
| 189760 | 2002 AK_{139} | — | January 9, 2002 | Socorro | LINEAR | · | 3.0 km | MPC · JPL |
| 189761 | 2002 AR_{155} | — | January 14, 2002 | Socorro | LINEAR | HNS | 2.1 km | MPC · JPL |
| 189762 | 2002 AF_{157} | — | January 13, 2002 | Socorro | LINEAR | · | 1.7 km | MPC · JPL |
| 189763 | 2002 AV_{160} | — | January 13, 2002 | Socorro | LINEAR | (5) | 1.7 km | MPC · JPL |
| 189764 | 2002 AS_{191} | — | January 12, 2002 | Kitt Peak | Spacewatch | V | 1.1 km | MPC · JPL |
| 189765 | 2002 BC_{11} | — | January 18, 2002 | Socorro | LINEAR | · | 4.7 km | MPC · JPL |
| 189766 | 2002 BK_{19} | — | January 21, 2002 | Palomar | NEAT | HNS | 2.0 km | MPC · JPL |
| 189767 | 2002 CH_{3} | — | February 3, 2002 | Palomar | NEAT | · | 4.2 km | MPC · JPL |
| 189768 | 2002 CF_{40} | — | February 6, 2002 | Haleakala | NEAT | H | 850 m | MPC · JPL |
| 189769 | 2002 CT_{71} | — | February 7, 2002 | Socorro | LINEAR | · | 3.5 km | MPC · JPL |
| 189770 | 2002 CL_{73} | — | February 7, 2002 | Socorro | LINEAR | · | 2.3 km | MPC · JPL |
| 189771 | 2002 CY_{74} | — | February 7, 2002 | Socorro | LINEAR | · | 4.0 km | MPC · JPL |
| 189772 | 2002 CQ_{78} | — | February 7, 2002 | Socorro | LINEAR | L4 | 20 km | MPC · JPL |
| 189773 | 2002 CN_{123} | — | February 7, 2002 | Socorro | LINEAR | · | 2.9 km | MPC · JPL |
| 189774 | 2002 CY_{124} | — | February 7, 2002 | Socorro | LINEAR | · | 3.2 km | MPC · JPL |
| 189775 | 2002 CQ_{130} | — | February 7, 2002 | Socorro | LINEAR | L4 | 10 km | MPC · JPL |
| 189776 | 2002 CM_{140} | — | February 8, 2002 | Socorro | LINEAR | · | 5.2 km | MPC · JPL |
| 189777 | 2002 CK_{175} | — | February 10, 2002 | Socorro | LINEAR | · | 3.8 km | MPC · JPL |
| 189778 | 2002 CW_{200} | — | February 10, 2002 | Socorro | LINEAR | · | 2.4 km | MPC · JPL |
| 189779 | 2002 CJ_{203} | — | February 10, 2002 | Socorro | LINEAR | · | 1.8 km | MPC · JPL |
| 189780 | 2002 CA_{275} | — | February 8, 2002 | Kitt Peak | Spacewatch | · | 1.5 km | MPC · JPL |
| 189781 | 2002 CF_{278} | — | February 7, 2002 | Palomar | NEAT | DOR | 5.1 km | MPC · JPL |
| 189782 | 2002 CX_{299} | — | February 11, 2002 | Socorro | LINEAR | · | 1.5 km | MPC · JPL |
| 189783 | 2002 CC_{302} | — | February 12, 2002 | Socorro | LINEAR | · | 4.0 km | MPC · JPL |
| 189784 | 2002 DE_{2} | — | February 19, 2002 | Socorro | LINEAR | H | 880 m | MPC · JPL |
| 189785 | 2002 DG_{3} | — | February 21, 2002 | Socorro | LINEAR | H | 1.1 km | MPC · JPL |
| 189786 | 2002 DX_{3} | — | February 22, 2002 | Socorro | LINEAR | · | 6.5 km | MPC · JPL |
| 189787 | 2002 EA_{2} | — | March 9, 2002 | Bohyunsan | Bohyunsan | · | 1.4 km | MPC · JPL |
| 189788 | 2002 ER_{27} | — | March 9, 2002 | Socorro | LINEAR | · | 2.4 km | MPC · JPL |
| 189789 | 2002 EV_{46} | — | March 11, 2002 | Palomar | NEAT | · | 3.9 km | MPC · JPL |
| 189790 | 2002 EU_{127} | — | March 12, 2002 | Palomar | NEAT | · | 3.0 km | MPC · JPL |
| 189791 | 2002 EW_{140} | — | March 12, 2002 | Palomar | NEAT | · | 2.6 km | MPC · JPL |
| 189792 | 2002 EG_{141} | — | March 12, 2002 | Palomar | NEAT | · | 2.7 km | MPC · JPL |
| 189793 | 2002 ET_{148} | — | March 15, 2002 | Palomar | NEAT | 615 | 2.3 km | MPC · JPL |
| 189794 | 2002 EN_{154} | — | March 13, 2002 | Socorro | LINEAR | PAD | 3.7 km | MPC · JPL |
| 189795 McGehee | 2002 ER_{159} | McGehee | March 5, 2002 | Apache Point | SDSS | · | 3.1 km | MPC · JPL |
| 189796 | 2002 GL_{2} | — | April 7, 2002 | Mount Hopkins | T. B. Spahr | · | 5.0 km | MPC · JPL |
| 189797 | 2002 GV_{50} | — | April 5, 2002 | Anderson Mesa | LONEOS | · | 3.5 km | MPC · JPL |
| 189798 | 2002 GH_{131} | — | April 12, 2002 | Socorro | LINEAR | · | 2.3 km | MPC · JPL |
| 189799 | 2002 GL_{139} | — | April 13, 2002 | Kitt Peak | Spacewatch | HOF | 4.4 km | MPC · JPL |
| 189800 | 2002 GU_{149} | — | April 14, 2002 | Socorro | LINEAR | · | 4.9 km | MPC · JPL |

== 189801–189900 ==
back to top

| Designation | | | Discovery | | | Properties | | Ref |
| Permanent | Provisional | Named after | Date | Site | Discoverer(s) | Category | Diam. | Ref |
|---|---|---|---|---|---|---|---|---|
| 189801 | 2002 JT_{45} | — | May 9, 2002 | Socorro | LINEAR | · | 3.7 km | MPC · JPL |
| 189802 | 2002 JH_{81} | — | May 11, 2002 | Socorro | LINEAR | EUN | 2.5 km | MPC · JPL |
| 189803 | 2002 JW_{87} | — | May 11, 2002 | Socorro | LINEAR | · | 4.1 km | MPC · JPL |
| 189804 | 2002 JH_{101} | — | May 7, 2002 | Socorro | LINEAR | · | 5.5 km | MPC · JPL |
| 189805 | 2002 JU_{114} | — | May 13, 2002 | Socorro | LINEAR | · | 6.1 km | MPC · JPL |
| 189806 | 2002 JX_{148} | — | May 9, 2002 | Palomar | NEAT | AGN | 2.0 km | MPC · JPL |
| 189807 | 2002 KR_{12} | — | May 17, 2002 | Kitt Peak | Spacewatch | · | 4.3 km | MPC · JPL |
| 189808 | 2002 KU_{14} | — | May 30, 2002 | Palomar | NEAT | · | 4.8 km | MPC · JPL |
| 189809 | 2002 LO_{19} | — | June 6, 2002 | Socorro | LINEAR | fast | 5.1 km | MPC · JPL |
| 189810 | 2002 LJ_{32} | — | June 9, 2002 | Palomar | NEAT | · | 6.3 km | MPC · JPL |
| 189811 | 2002 LB_{53} | — | June 8, 2002 | Socorro | LINEAR | · | 4.3 km | MPC · JPL |
| 189812 | 2002 NQ_{4} | — | July 9, 2002 | Campo Imperatore | CINEOS | · | 8.3 km | MPC · JPL |
| 189813 | 2002 NB_{12} | — | July 4, 2002 | Palomar | NEAT | · | 4.6 km | MPC · JPL |
| 189814 | 2002 NU_{22} | — | July 9, 2002 | Socorro | LINEAR | · | 6.9 km | MPC · JPL |
| 189815 | 2002 NK_{28} | — | July 12, 2002 | Palomar | NEAT | · | 6.3 km | MPC · JPL |
| 189816 | 2002 NT_{28} | — | July 13, 2002 | Haleakala | NEAT | · | 8.8 km | MPC · JPL |
| 189817 | 2002 NW_{30} | — | July 8, 2002 | Palomar | NEAT | · | 6.3 km | MPC · JPL |
| 189818 | 2002 NL_{33} | — | July 13, 2002 | Socorro | LINEAR | · | 9.8 km | MPC · JPL |
| 189819 | 2002 NC_{60} | — | July 14, 2002 | Palomar | NEAT | · | 5.1 km | MPC · JPL |
| 189820 | 2002 OG_{7} | — | July 20, 2002 | Palomar | NEAT | · | 8.1 km | MPC · JPL |
| 189821 | 2002 OC_{18} | — | July 18, 2002 | Socorro | LINEAR | · | 4.8 km | MPC · JPL |
| 189822 | 2002 PR_{57} | — | August 9, 2002 | Socorro | LINEAR | · | 6.9 km | MPC · JPL |
| 189823 | 2002 PU_{76} | — | August 11, 2002 | Palomar | NEAT | EUP | 6.2 km | MPC · JPL |
| 189824 | 2002 PE_{99} | — | August 14, 2002 | Socorro | LINEAR | URS | 7.3 km | MPC · JPL |
| 189825 | 2002 QC_{16} | — | August 26, 2002 | Palomar | NEAT | · | 5.8 km | MPC · JPL |
| 189826 | 2002 RN_{177} | — | September 13, 2002 | Palomar | NEAT | · | 1.3 km | MPC · JPL |
| 189827 | 2002 TE_{53} | — | October 2, 2002 | Socorro | LINEAR | · | 1.3 km | MPC · JPL |
| 189828 | 2002 TD_{266} | — | October 10, 2002 | Socorro | LINEAR | · | 1.3 km | MPC · JPL |
| 189829 | 2002 VQ_{6} | — | November 5, 2002 | Socorro | LINEAR | · | 720 m | MPC · JPL |
| 189830 | 2002 VL_{14} | — | November 5, 2002 | Palomar | NEAT | · | 1.5 km | MPC · JPL |
| 189831 | 2002 VW_{94} | — | November 13, 2002 | Socorro | LINEAR | · | 1.2 km | MPC · JPL |
| 189832 | 2002 XL_{25} | — | December 5, 2002 | Socorro | LINEAR | · | 1.3 km | MPC · JPL |
| 189833 | 2002 XD_{106} | — | December 5, 2002 | Socorro | LINEAR | · | 1.2 km | MPC · JPL |
| 189834 | 2002 YL_{22} | — | December 31, 2002 | Socorro | LINEAR | · | 1.6 km | MPC · JPL |
| 189835 | 2002 YJ_{27} | — | December 31, 2002 | Socorro | LINEAR | · | 1.8 km | MPC · JPL |
| 189836 | 2003 AN_{29} | — | January 4, 2003 | Socorro | LINEAR | · | 1.9 km | MPC · JPL |
| 189837 | 2003 AU_{51} | — | January 5, 2003 | Socorro | LINEAR | · | 1.2 km | MPC · JPL |
| 189838 | 2003 AM_{79} | — | January 11, 2003 | Kitt Peak | Spacewatch | PHO | 1.3 km | MPC · JPL |
| 189839 | 2003 AQ_{83} | — | January 4, 2003 | Kitt Peak | Deep Lens Survey | · | 4.0 km | MPC · JPL |
| 189840 | 2003 BC_{9} | — | January 26, 2003 | Anderson Mesa | LONEOS | · | 1.5 km | MPC · JPL |
| 189841 | 2003 BS_{14} | — | January 26, 2003 | Haleakala | NEAT | NYS | 2.2 km | MPC · JPL |
| 189842 | 2003 BA_{52} | — | January 27, 2003 | Socorro | LINEAR | V | 970 m | MPC · JPL |
| 189843 | 2003 BK_{65} | — | January 30, 2003 | Anderson Mesa | LONEOS | NYS | 1.3 km | MPC · JPL |
| 189844 | 2003 DO_{7} | — | February 22, 2003 | Palomar | NEAT | NYS · fast | 1.9 km | MPC · JPL |
| 189845 | 2003 EA_{12} | — | March 6, 2003 | Socorro | LINEAR | · | 2.2 km | MPC · JPL |
| 189846 | 2003 ES_{30} | — | March 6, 2003 | Palomar | NEAT | · | 2.3 km | MPC · JPL |
| 189847 | 2003 EW_{34} | — | March 7, 2003 | Socorro | LINEAR | · | 1.3 km | MPC · JPL |
| 189848 Eivissa | 2003 FF_{2} | Eivissa | March 23, 2003 | Mallorca | OAM | · | 2.0 km | MPC · JPL |
| 189849 | 2003 FX_{3} | — | March 25, 2003 | Palomar | NEAT | BAR | 1.7 km | MPC · JPL |
| 189850 | 2003 FE_{68} | — | March 26, 2003 | Palomar | NEAT | EUN | 1.9 km | MPC · JPL |
| 189851 | 2003 FT_{74} | — | March 26, 2003 | Palomar | NEAT | EUN | 2.3 km | MPC · JPL |
| 189852 | 2003 FB_{81} | — | March 27, 2003 | Kitt Peak | Spacewatch | · | 5.0 km | MPC · JPL |
| 189853 | 2003 FF_{102} | — | March 31, 2003 | Socorro | LINEAR | MAR | 1.5 km | MPC · JPL |
| 189854 | 2003 FR_{105} | — | March 26, 2003 | Palomar | NEAT | · | 1.7 km | MPC · JPL |
| 189855 | 2003 GQ_{9} | — | April 2, 2003 | Socorro | LINEAR | EUN | 2.1 km | MPC · JPL |
| 189856 | 2003 GV_{35} | — | April 5, 2003 | Anderson Mesa | LONEOS | BRG | 2.7 km | MPC · JPL |
| 189857 | 2003 GV_{55} | — | April 4, 2003 | Kvistaberg | Uppsala-DLR Asteroid Survey | · | 2.9 km | MPC · JPL |
| 189858 | 2003 HX_{1} | — | April 23, 2003 | Reedy Creek | J. Broughton | · | 3.0 km | MPC · JPL |
| 189859 | 2003 HB_{17} | — | April 24, 2003 | Anderson Mesa | LONEOS | L4 | 16 km | MPC · JPL |
| 189860 | 2003 HF_{27} | — | April 27, 2003 | Anderson Mesa | LONEOS | · | 2.9 km | MPC · JPL |
| 189861 | 2003 HW_{34} | — | April 26, 2003 | Kitt Peak | Spacewatch | · | 2.1 km | MPC · JPL |
| 189862 | 2003 HB_{38} | — | April 28, 2003 | Kitt Peak | Spacewatch | · | 2.3 km | MPC · JPL |
| 189863 | 2003 HC_{52} | — | April 30, 2003 | Kitt Peak | Spacewatch | · | 3.1 km | MPC · JPL |
| 189864 | 2003 JO_{9} | — | May 2, 2003 | Socorro | LINEAR | · | 3.3 km | MPC · JPL |
| 189865 | 2003 NC | — | July 1, 2003 | Socorro | LINEAR | APO · PHA | 450 m | MPC · JPL |
| 189866 | 2003 PK_{1} | — | August 1, 2003 | Haleakala | NEAT | GEF | 2.3 km | MPC · JPL |
| 189867 | 2003 QV_{2} | — | August 19, 2003 | Campo Imperatore | CINEOS | · | 5.2 km | MPC · JPL |
| 189868 | 2003 QW_{3} | — | August 18, 2003 | Haleakala | NEAT | · | 2.6 km | MPC · JPL |
| 189869 | 2003 QO_{15} | — | August 20, 2003 | Palomar | NEAT | · | 4.2 km | MPC · JPL |
| 189870 | 2003 QO_{21} | — | August 22, 2003 | Palomar | NEAT | · | 7.1 km | MPC · JPL |
| 189871 | 2003 QV_{22} | — | August 20, 2003 | Palomar | NEAT | · | 5.0 km | MPC · JPL |
| 189872 | 2003 QY_{22} | — | August 20, 2003 | Palomar | NEAT | EOS | 3.2 km | MPC · JPL |
| 189873 | 2003 QO_{31} | — | August 21, 2003 | Palomar | NEAT | · | 3.8 km | MPC · JPL |
| 189874 | 2003 QY_{47} | — | August 20, 2003 | Palomar | NEAT | · | 3.0 km | MPC · JPL |
| 189875 | 2003 QT_{60} | — | August 23, 2003 | Socorro | LINEAR | TEL | 3.5 km | MPC · JPL |
| 189876 | 2003 QE_{64} | — | August 23, 2003 | Socorro | LINEAR | · | 5.5 km | MPC · JPL |
| 189877 | 2003 QR_{94} | — | August 28, 2003 | Haleakala | NEAT | EOS | 5.2 km | MPC · JPL |
| 189878 | 2003 QV_{95} | — | August 30, 2003 | Haleakala | NEAT | · | 4.9 km | MPC · JPL |
| 189879 | 2003 RT | — | September 2, 2003 | Socorro | LINEAR | · | 6.3 km | MPC · JPL |
| 189880 | 2003 RV_{4} | — | September 3, 2003 | Haleakala | NEAT | · | 4.6 km | MPC · JPL |
| 189881 | 2003 RG_{11} | — | September 13, 2003 | Haleakala | NEAT | · | 6.0 km | MPC · JPL |
| 189882 | 2003 RZ_{12} | — | September 14, 2003 | Haleakala | NEAT | · | 3.3 km | MPC · JPL |
| 189883 | 2003 RV_{13} | — | September 15, 2003 | Haleakala | NEAT | · | 6.5 km | MPC · JPL |
| 189884 | 2003 RF_{16} | — | September 15, 2003 | Haleakala | NEAT | EOS | 3.2 km | MPC · JPL |
| 189885 | 2003 RO_{17} | — | September 15, 2003 | Palomar | NEAT | · | 7.5 km | MPC · JPL |
| 189886 | 2003 RY_{17} | — | September 15, 2003 | Palomar | NEAT | · | 3.0 km | MPC · JPL |
| 189887 | 2003 RF_{22} | — | September 14, 2003 | Haleakala | NEAT | EMA | 6.7 km | MPC · JPL |
| 189888 | 2003 SQ_{17} | — | September 17, 2003 | Kvistaberg | Uppsala-DLR Asteroid Survey | · | 4.4 km | MPC · JPL |
| 189889 | 2003 SF_{25} | — | September 17, 2003 | Haleakala | NEAT | EOS | 3.5 km | MPC · JPL |
| 189890 | 2003 SY_{25} | — | September 17, 2003 | Haleakala | NEAT | · | 5.0 km | MPC · JPL |
| 189891 | 2003 SR_{28} | — | September 18, 2003 | Palomar | NEAT | · | 4.9 km | MPC · JPL |
| 189892 | 2003 SZ_{29} | — | September 18, 2003 | Palomar | NEAT | · | 3.2 km | MPC · JPL |
| 189893 | 2003 SZ_{35} | — | September 18, 2003 | Socorro | LINEAR | HYG | 6.5 km | MPC · JPL |
| 189894 | 2003 SX_{38} | — | September 16, 2003 | Palomar | NEAT | · | 4.3 km | MPC · JPL |
| 189895 | 2003 SD_{40} | — | September 16, 2003 | Palomar | NEAT | · | 6.8 km | MPC · JPL |
| 189896 | 2003 SU_{47} | — | September 18, 2003 | Palomar | NEAT | · | 3.6 km | MPC · JPL |
| 189897 | 2003 SS_{50} | — | September 18, 2003 | Palomar | NEAT | · | 4.8 km | MPC · JPL |
| 189898 | 2003 SO_{54} | — | September 16, 2003 | Anderson Mesa | LONEOS | EOS | 3.3 km | MPC · JPL |
| 189899 | 2003 SG_{55} | — | September 16, 2003 | Anderson Mesa | LONEOS | · | 3.5 km | MPC · JPL |
| 189900 | 2003 SD_{63} | — | September 17, 2003 | Kitt Peak | Spacewatch | · | 4.4 km | MPC · JPL |

== 189901–190000 ==
back to top

| Designation | | | Discovery | | | Properties | | Ref |
| Permanent | Provisional | Named after | Date | Site | Discoverer(s) | Category | Diam. | Ref |
|---|---|---|---|---|---|---|---|---|
| 189901 | 2003 SQ_{86} | — | September 16, 2003 | Palomar | NEAT | · | 6.6 km | MPC · JPL |
| 189902 | 2003 SN_{95} | — | September 19, 2003 | Palomar | NEAT | · | 4.1 km | MPC · JPL |
| 189903 | 2003 SW_{95} | — | September 19, 2003 | Palomar | NEAT | · | 4.7 km | MPC · JPL |
| 189904 | 2003 SM_{99} | — | September 19, 2003 | Haleakala | NEAT | · | 3.2 km | MPC · JPL |
| 189905 | 2003 SO_{99} | — | September 19, 2003 | Haleakala | NEAT | EOS | 3.5 km | MPC · JPL |
| 189906 | 2003 SU_{100} | — | September 20, 2003 | Desert Eagle | W. K. Y. Yeung | · | 4.8 km | MPC · JPL |
| 189907 | 2003 SH_{108} | — | September 20, 2003 | Palomar | NEAT | · | 4.4 km | MPC · JPL |
| 189908 | 2003 SQ_{109} | — | September 20, 2003 | Kitt Peak | Spacewatch | · | 3.9 km | MPC · JPL |
| 189909 | 2003 SB_{110} | — | September 20, 2003 | Palomar | NEAT | HYG | 5.3 km | MPC · JPL |
| 189910 | 2003 SO_{110} | — | September 20, 2003 | Palomar | NEAT | · | 5.5 km | MPC · JPL |
| 189911 | 2003 ST_{115} | — | September 16, 2003 | Palomar | NEAT | EOS | 4.8 km | MPC · JPL |
| 189912 | 2003 SJ_{117} | — | September 16, 2003 | Kitt Peak | Spacewatch | · | 5.4 km | MPC · JPL |
| 189913 | 2003 SR_{117} | — | September 16, 2003 | Palomar | NEAT | EOS | 3.6 km | MPC · JPL |
| 189914 | 2003 SZ_{118} | — | September 16, 2003 | Kitt Peak | Spacewatch | · | 3.8 km | MPC · JPL |
| 189915 | 2003 SM_{138} | — | September 20, 2003 | Socorro | LINEAR | EOS | 4.0 km | MPC · JPL |
| 189916 | 2003 SD_{141} | — | September 19, 2003 | Palomar | NEAT | EOS | 4.2 km | MPC · JPL |
| 189917 | 2003 SV_{141} | — | September 20, 2003 | Campo Imperatore | CINEOS | HYG | 5.2 km | MPC · JPL |
| 189918 | 2003 SH_{143} | — | September 20, 2003 | Socorro | LINEAR | · | 5.7 km | MPC · JPL |
| 189919 | 2003 SY_{144} | — | September 19, 2003 | Palomar | NEAT | EOS | 4.4 km | MPC · JPL |
| 189920 | 2003 SE_{150} | — | September 17, 2003 | Socorro | LINEAR | · | 3.7 km | MPC · JPL |
| 189921 | 2003 SW_{154} | — | September 19, 2003 | Anderson Mesa | LONEOS | LIX | 5.3 km | MPC · JPL |
| 189922 | 2003 SW_{160} | — | September 17, 2003 | Kitt Peak | Spacewatch | · | 5.3 km | MPC · JPL |
| 189923 | 2003 SD_{169} | — | September 23, 2003 | Haleakala | NEAT | · | 5.7 km | MPC · JPL |
| 189924 | 2003 SM_{172} | — | September 18, 2003 | Socorro | LINEAR | EOS | 4.0 km | MPC · JPL |
| 189925 | 2003 SC_{174} | — | September 18, 2003 | Palomar | NEAT | (1298) | 4.7 km | MPC · JPL |
| 189926 | 2003 SP_{183} | — | September 21, 2003 | Socorro | LINEAR | · | 7.3 km | MPC · JPL |
| 189927 | 2003 SH_{191} | — | September 18, 2003 | Palomar | NEAT | · | 5.6 km | MPC · JPL |
| 189928 | 2003 SV_{191} | — | September 19, 2003 | Palomar | NEAT | · | 6.0 km | MPC · JPL |
| 189929 | 2003 SW_{191} | — | September 19, 2003 | Palomar | NEAT | · | 5.5 km | MPC · JPL |
| 189930 Jeanneherbert | 2003 SR_{200} | Jeanneherbert | September 22, 2003 | Junk Bond | D. Healy | · | 4.6 km | MPC · JPL |
| 189931 | 2003 SE_{202} | — | September 22, 2003 | Anderson Mesa | LONEOS | · | 5.9 km | MPC · JPL |
| 189932 | 2003 SX_{203} | — | September 22, 2003 | Anderson Mesa | LONEOS | · | 3.7 km | MPC · JPL |
| 189933 | 2003 SW_{208} | — | September 23, 2003 | Palomar | NEAT | TEL | 2.6 km | MPC · JPL |
| 189934 | 2003 SW_{213} | — | September 26, 2003 | Palomar | NEAT | · | 6.1 km | MPC · JPL |
| 189935 | 2003 SH_{230} | — | September 24, 2003 | Palomar | NEAT | · | 3.4 km | MPC · JPL |
| 189936 | 2003 SO_{243} | — | September 28, 2003 | Kitt Peak | Spacewatch | · | 3.3 km | MPC · JPL |
| 189937 | 2003 SK_{270} | — | September 24, 2003 | Haleakala | NEAT | · | 6.7 km | MPC · JPL |
| 189938 | 2003 SS_{275} | — | September 29, 2003 | Socorro | LINEAR | EOS | 3.3 km | MPC · JPL |
| 189939 | 2003 SF_{286} | — | September 20, 2003 | Palomar | NEAT | · | 5.0 km | MPC · JPL |
| 189940 | 2003 SV_{291} | — | September 30, 2003 | Socorro | LINEAR | · | 7.7 km | MPC · JPL |
| 189941 | 2003 SJ_{294} | — | September 28, 2003 | Socorro | LINEAR | LIX | 6.3 km | MPC · JPL |
| 189942 | 2003 SC_{297} | — | September 18, 2003 | Haleakala | NEAT | EOS | 3.6 km | MPC · JPL |
| 189943 | 2003 SD_{297} | — | September 18, 2003 | Haleakala | NEAT | · | 5.1 km | MPC · JPL |
| 189944 Leblanc | 2003 TX | Leblanc | October 3, 2003 | Wrightwood | J. W. Young | · | 6.2 km | MPC · JPL |
| 189945 Teddykareta | 2003 TP_{3} | Teddykareta | October 4, 2003 | Goodricke-Pigott | Reddy, V. | · | 5.1 km | MPC · JPL |
| 189946 | 2003 TO_{10} | — | October 14, 2003 | Palomar | NEAT | · | 6.6 km | MPC · JPL |
| 189947 | 2003 TF_{17} | — | October 15, 2003 | Anderson Mesa | LONEOS | · | 4.6 km | MPC · JPL |
| 189948 Richswanson | 2003 UM_{4} | Richswanson | October 16, 2003 | Junk Bond | D. Healy | LIX | 4.5 km | MPC · JPL |
| 189949 | 2003 UY_{4} | — | October 17, 2003 | Socorro | LINEAR | T_{j} (2.98) · EUP | 8.0 km | MPC · JPL |
| 189950 | 2003 UC_{7} | — | October 16, 2003 | Anderson Mesa | LONEOS | H | 930 m | MPC · JPL |
| 189951 | 2003 UX_{23} | — | October 22, 2003 | Kvistaberg | Uppsala-DLR Asteroid Survey | THM | 4.3 km | MPC · JPL |
| 189952 | 2003 UM_{35} | — | October 16, 2003 | Palomar | NEAT | · | 6.8 km | MPC · JPL |
| 189953 | 2003 UA_{56} | — | October 19, 2003 | Goodricke-Pigott | R. A. Tucker | · | 4.0 km | MPC · JPL |
| 189954 | 2003 UA_{59} | — | October 16, 2003 | Palomar | NEAT | · | 6.4 km | MPC · JPL |
| 189955 | 2003 UQ_{60} | — | October 16, 2003 | Palomar | NEAT | · | 6.0 km | MPC · JPL |
| 189956 | 2003 UX_{62} | — | October 16, 2003 | Palomar | NEAT | · | 4.8 km | MPC · JPL |
| 189957 | 2003 UZ_{62} | — | October 16, 2003 | Palomar | NEAT | VER | 6.7 km | MPC · JPL |
| 189958 | 2003 UK_{64} | — | October 16, 2003 | Anderson Mesa | LONEOS | EOS | 3.5 km | MPC · JPL |
| 189959 | 2003 UQ_{65} | — | October 16, 2003 | Palomar | NEAT | · | 4.8 km | MPC · JPL |
| 189960 | 2003 UE_{75} | — | October 17, 2003 | Anderson Mesa | LONEOS | EOS | 3.7 km | MPC · JPL |
| 189961 | 2003 UJ_{87} | — | October 19, 2003 | Anderson Mesa | LONEOS | H | 980 m | MPC · JPL |
| 189962 | 2003 UF_{124} | — | October 20, 2003 | Socorro | LINEAR | · | 5.3 km | MPC · JPL |
| 189963 | 2003 UA_{143} | — | October 18, 2003 | Anderson Mesa | LONEOS | · | 4.7 km | MPC · JPL |
| 189964 | 2003 UB_{190} | — | October 22, 2003 | Kitt Peak | Spacewatch | · | 5.1 km | MPC · JPL |
| 189965 | 2003 UB_{194} | — | October 20, 2003 | Socorro | LINEAR | · | 3.4 km | MPC · JPL |
| 189966 | 2003 UV_{200} | — | October 21, 2003 | Socorro | LINEAR | · | 4.2 km | MPC · JPL |
| 189967 | 2003 UL_{220} | — | October 21, 2003 | Kitt Peak | Spacewatch | · | 4.7 km | MPC · JPL |
| 189968 | 2003 UG_{256} | — | October 25, 2003 | Socorro | LINEAR | · | 4.7 km | MPC · JPL |
| 189969 | 2003 UP_{276} | — | October 30, 2003 | Socorro | LINEAR | · | 7.9 km | MPC · JPL |
| 189970 | 2003 WJ_{74} | — | November 20, 2003 | Socorro | LINEAR | · | 4.9 km | MPC · JPL |
| 189971 | 2003 WF_{86} | — | November 21, 2003 | Socorro | LINEAR | · | 3.5 km | MPC · JPL |
| 189972 | 2003 WB_{154} | — | November 29, 2003 | Socorro | LINEAR | H | 850 m | MPC · JPL |
| 189973 | 2003 XE_{11} | — | December 13, 2003 | Socorro | LINEAR | AMO +1km | 1.1 km | MPC · JPL |
| 189974 | 2003 XU_{34} | — | December 3, 2003 | Socorro | LINEAR | · | 5.2 km | MPC · JPL |
| 189975 | 2003 YN_{62} | — | December 19, 2003 | Socorro | LINEAR | · | 2.4 km | MPC · JPL |
| 189976 | 2004 BU_{27} | — | January 18, 2004 | Palomar | NEAT | · | 3.1 km | MPC · JPL |
| 189977 | 2004 CB_{32} | — | February 12, 2004 | Kitt Peak | Spacewatch | 3:2 | 7.3 km | MPC · JPL |
| 189978 | 2004 CL_{77} | — | February 11, 2004 | Palomar | NEAT | · | 1.0 km | MPC · JPL |
| 189979 | 2004 DG_{18} | — | February 18, 2004 | Haleakala | NEAT | · | 1.2 km | MPC · JPL |
| 189980 | 2004 DH_{24} | — | February 19, 2004 | Socorro | LINEAR | · | 1.6 km | MPC · JPL |
| 189981 | 2004 DM_{31} | — | February 17, 2004 | Socorro | LINEAR | · | 1.2 km | MPC · JPL |
| 189982 | 2004 EE_{20} | — | March 14, 2004 | Kitt Peak | Spacewatch | · | 920 m | MPC · JPL |
| 189983 | 2004 ER_{44} | — | March 15, 2004 | Kitt Peak | Spacewatch | · | 990 m | MPC · JPL |
| 189984 | 2004 EX_{67} | — | March 15, 2004 | Catalina | CSS | · | 1.1 km | MPC · JPL |
| 189985 | 2004 FL_{2} | — | March 16, 2004 | Catalina | CSS | · | 1.3 km | MPC · JPL |
| 189986 | 2004 FR_{3} | — | March 18, 2004 | Socorro | LINEAR | · | 1.0 km | MPC · JPL |
| 189987 | 2004 FP_{5} | — | March 19, 2004 | Palomar | NEAT | · | 1.3 km | MPC · JPL |
| 189988 | 2004 FR_{28} | — | March 23, 2004 | Socorro | LINEAR | · | 1.3 km | MPC · JPL |
| 189989 | 2004 FX_{80} | — | March 16, 2004 | Socorro | LINEAR | · | 1.6 km | MPC · JPL |
| 189990 | 2004 FF_{146} | — | March 31, 2004 | Kitt Peak | Spacewatch | V | 1.1 km | MPC · JPL |
| 189991 | 2004 GR | — | April 9, 2004 | Siding Spring | SSS | · | 1.3 km | MPC · JPL |
| 189992 | 2004 GA_{22} | — | April 12, 2004 | Palomar | NEAT | V | 830 m | MPC · JPL |
| 189993 | 2004 GO_{29} | — | April 12, 2004 | Anderson Mesa | LONEOS | V | 920 m | MPC · JPL |
| 189994 | 2004 GH_{33} | — | April 12, 2004 | Palomar | NEAT | · | 1.1 km | MPC · JPL |
| 189995 | 2004 GJ_{38} | — | April 15, 2004 | Catalina | CSS | · | 1.3 km | MPC · JPL |
| 189996 | 2004 GW_{60} | — | April 14, 2004 | Palomar | NEAT | PHO | 1.8 km | MPC · JPL |
| 189997 | 2004 HF_{3} | — | April 16, 2004 | Socorro | LINEAR | · | 960 m | MPC · JPL |
| 189998 | 2004 HX_{6} | — | April 16, 2004 | Socorro | LINEAR | NYS | 1.6 km | MPC · JPL |
| 189999 | 2004 HB_{11} | — | April 19, 2004 | Socorro | LINEAR | · | 1.2 km | MPC · JPL |
| 190000 | 2004 HG_{19} | — | April 19, 2004 | Socorro | LINEAR | · | 1.3 km | MPC · JPL |

back to top

== See also ==
- Meanings of minor-planet names: 189001–190000
