= First contact =

First contact may refer to:

- First contact (astronomy), the moment in astronomical transit when the apparent positions of the two bodies first touch
- First contact (anthropology), the first meeting of two cultures previously unaware of one another
- First contact (science fiction), a common science fiction theme about the first meeting between humans and extraterrestrial life

== Titles ==
=== Film ===
- Star Trek: First Contact, a 1996 film in the Star Trek science fiction franchise
- First Contact (1983 film), a 1983 documentary by Bob Connolly and Robin Anderson
- Ultraman Cosmos: The First Contact, a 2001 theatrical film adaptation of the Ultraman Cosmos TV series

=== Television ===
- First Contact (Australian TV series), a 2014 Australian television documentary
- First Contact (Canadian TV series), a 2018 Canadian documentary television series

==== TV episodes ====
- "First Contact" (Star Trek: The Next Generation), a 1991 episode of the science fiction television series Star Trek: The Next Generation
- "First Contact", the 1994 pilot episode of Earth 2 TV series
- "First Contact" (Stargate Atlantis), a 2008 episode of Stargate Atlantis
- "First Con-tact" (Star Trek: Prodigy), a 2022 episode of Star Trek: Prodigy
- "Episode 0: First Contact", one of the television specials in the Lupin III Japanese media franchise

=== Literature ===
- First Contact (novelette), a 1945 science fiction novelette by Murray Leinster
- First Contact?, a 1971 science fiction novel by Hugh Walters
- First Contact, a 2004 book by Mark Anstice
- First Contact: Or, It's Later Than You Think, a 2010 satire book by Evan Mandery

=== Music ===
- First Contact (Roger Sanchez album), 2001
- First Contact (Lastlings album), 2020

== See also ==
- Potential cultural impact of extraterrestrial contact
