= Extraterrestrial contact =

Extraterrestrial contact may refer to:

- Search for extraterrestrial intelligence
  - Potential cultural impact of extraterrestrial contact
- First contact (science fiction)
