= Star Trek Day =

Celebration of the anniversary of Star Trek

Star Trek Day is an annual informal commemorative day on September 8, referencing the broadcast US premiere of the original Star Trek series on that day in 1966, with the airing of "The Man Trap". The world premiere was on September 6 in Canada. The day is celebrated by fans across the world to acknowledge the cultural impact of the Star Trek franchise.

== History ==
Star Trek, created by Gene Roddenberry, debuted on the NBC TV network in 1966. The series presented an optimistic future where diversity and exploration were emphasized. It was canceled after three seasons but later achieved a cult following that spurred numerous sequels and cinematic releases.

The recognition of Star Trek Day began in 2020.

== Celebrations ==
Activities typically include screenings, interviews, thematic events, and the release of franchise-related content. It has also included collaborations with global nonprofit organizations that resonate with the franchise's foundational values, such as education, social change, and inclusion. These partnerships aim to promote a positive outlook on the future, reflecting the series' aspirational messages as well as encouraging fans to envision their influence on future developments.

Paramount+, which holds rights to the Star Trek franchise, often supports the day with access to selected episodes and organizes fan-engagement events.

The observance has been compared to May 4, which is Star Wars Day. First Contact Day on April 5 is another Star Trek themed observance, referencing the day of the fictional first contact between humans and aliens as depicted in the 1996 film Star Trek: First Contact.
