= Richard Hoagland =

Richard Hoagland may refer to:

- Richard C. Hoagland (born 1945), fringe researcher, famous for his theories on the Face on Mars
- Richard E. Hoagland (born 1950), U.S. diplomat
