= Archaeology, Anthropology, and Interstellar Communication =

2014 essay collection

- Editor: Douglas Vakoch
- Publisher: NASA
- Publication date: 22 May 2014
- Pages: 300
- ISBN: 978-1-62683-013-4
- Dewey Decimal: 999
- Text: Archaeology, Anthropology, and Interstellar Communication at NASA

Archaeology, Anthropology, and Interstellar Communication is a 2014 collection of essays edited by Douglas Vakoch and published by NASA. The book is focused on the role that the humanities and social sciences, in particular anthropology and archaeology, play in the search for extraterrestrial intelligence (SETI). The seventeen essays are gathered into four sections, which respectively explore the history of SETI as a field; archaeological comparisons for human-alien communication, such as the difficulties of translating ancient languages; the inferential gap between humans and aliens, and the consequences this would have for communication and trade; and the potential nature of alien intelligences.

Originally scheduled for publication in June 2014, a PDF of Archaeology, Anthropology, and Interstellar Communication was accidentally released a month before the intended date and reviewed by Gizmodo. The positive response to the review inspired NASA to bring forward its release as an e-book, making it available on their website from May of that year.

The book gained widespread media coverage upon release. As well as receiving generally positive reviews, it was at the center of controversy regarding misinterpretation of one of its essays. A quote about ancient terrestrial stone carvings, rhetorically stating that they "might have been made by aliens" for all that they were understood by modern anthropologists, was misreported by publications such as TheBlaze, The Huffington Post, and Artnet.

== Synopsis ==
Historically, research into extraterrestrial intelligence has fallen within natural science and focused primarily on the technological obstacles to alien communication, such as processing the data encoded in signals that could be received from extraterrestrial civilizations. Archaeology, Anthropology, and Interstellar Communication was written as part of an expansion of the field to humanities and social sciences, focusing on the role archaeologists and anthropologists play in extraterrestrial intelligence research. The problems of studying ancient societies on Earth, editor Douglas Vakoch argues, are applicable to those of studying potential societies outside Earth.

Archaeology, Anthropology, and Interstellar Communication is a collection of essays exploring these roles, focusing on both historical and modern perspectives. The book consists of seventeen essays, with an introduction and epilogue by Vakoch and fifteen chapters by researchers in the relevant fields; contributing authors include John Traphagan, Albert Harrison, Ben Finney, Steven J. Dick, John Billingham, and Dominique Lestel. Issues discussed in the essays include the evolutionary and cultural prerequisites for interstellar communication, the challenges for semiotics in decoding alien signs and symbols, and the complexities of cross-cultural communication with aliens by analogy to anthropological first contact experiences.

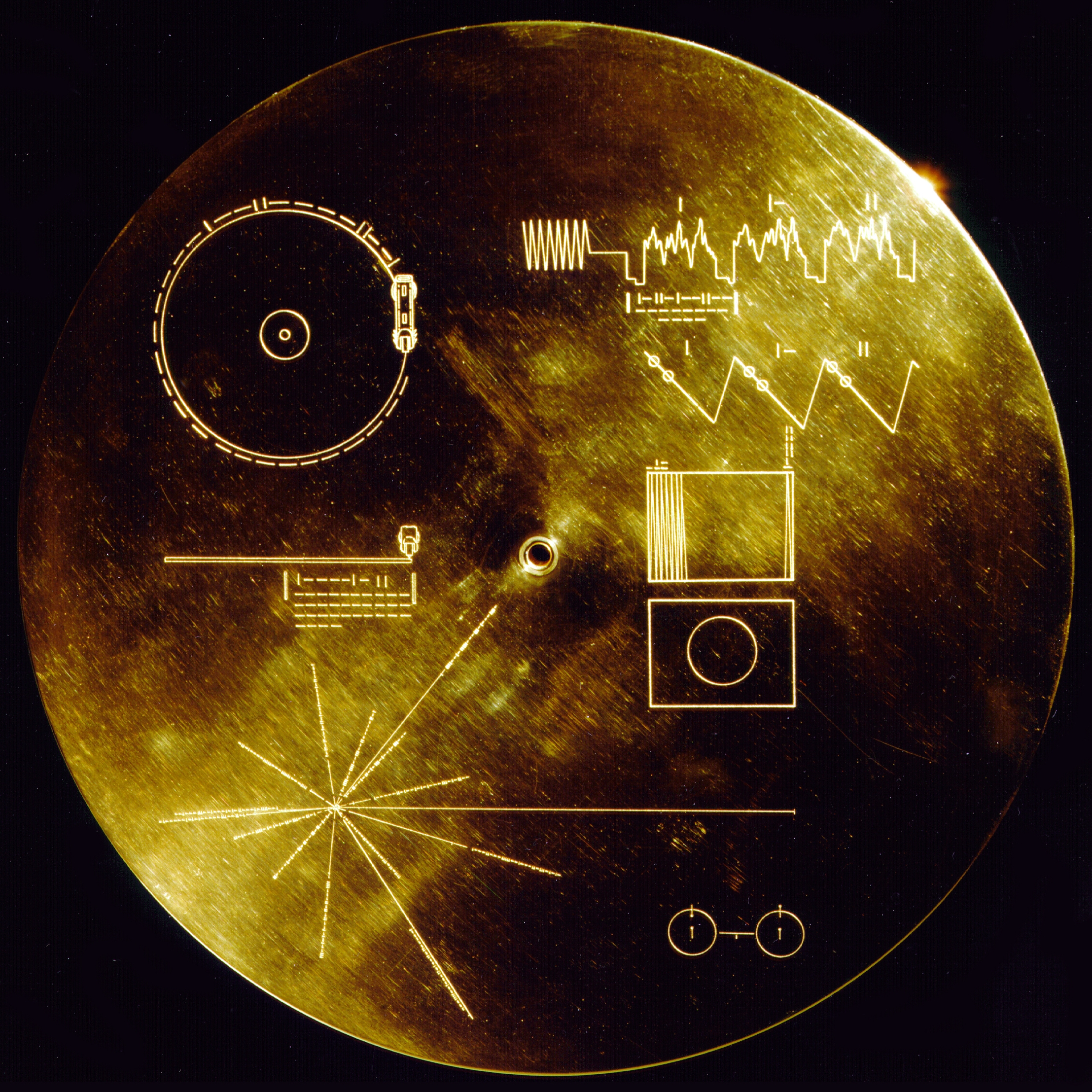
The Voyager Golden Record, a phonograph record sent on the Voyager spacecraft

=== Essays ===
Archaeology, Anthropology, and Interstellar Communication is subdivided into four sections, each with several essays. "Historical Perspectives on SETI" is a historiography of NASA's SETI (search for extraterrestrial intelligence) program, which ran for much of the late twentieth century before being dissolved due to lack of funding, and its humanities and social sciences representation. "Archaeological Analogues" draws comparisons between archaeology on Earth, where archaeologists frequently need to research societies they have little understanding of or shared context with, and communication with extraterrestrials. "Anthropology, Culture, and Communication" examines the role of anthropology in studying alien cultures and societies, such as the assumptions and challenges involved in cross-cultural communication and contact. "The Evolution and Embodiment of Extraterrestrials" deals with topics such as the appearance, diversity, and message design of alien intelligence.

==== "Historical Perspectives on SETI" ====
The essays in this section summarize the history of SETI at NASA, the circumstances that led to the government cutting public funding for SETI, and the role the social sciences have historically played in the search. The first essay in this section, "SETI: The NASA Years", is a synopsis of NASA's involvement with SETI by John Billingham, who was involved with the project from its genesis in 1969 to its closure in 1995. He discusses the 1960s origins of the search for alien life in the universe, the project's struggle to receive popular respect and government funding, and its ultimate cessation at the agency due to funding cuts, after which it was absorbed by the privately funded SETI Institute.

"A Political History of NASA's SETI Program" by Stephen J. Garber analyzes the circumstances that led to the end of public funding for the program. NASA's SETI program was small and provided few jobs that would make cutting it politically complex; widespread skepticism about the existence of intelligent alien life also made the project inherently controversial. NASA's funding also suffered through the 1990s due to publicized issues with the Hubble Space Telescope, weakening its ability to defend a marginal program such as SETI. "The Role of Anthropology in SETI: A Historical View" by Steven J. Dick discusses the history of SETI, anthropology, and their intersection. Representation of the social sciences in SETI research began during the field's early days in the 1960s and 1970s, but was, according to the essay, often tokenistic; Dick traces significant interdisciplinary work as beginning in the 1980s, with particular focus on the publication of Interstellar Migration and the Human Experience in 1986.

==== "Archaeological Analogues" ====
The Pioneer plaque, a pictogram representing human life and scientific knowledge, hosted onboard Pioneer 10 and 11

The essays in this section focus on the relevance of archaeological comparisons for discussing the anticipated difficulties with communication between humans and aliens. "A Tale of Two Analogues" by Ben Finney and Jerry Bentley draws on Finney's studies of Mayan culture. They draw comparisons between the protracted process of translating Mayan works and the difficulty of translating an alien work, and cast doubt on the views of some mathematicians and natural scientists that an extraterrestrial civilization would communicate with humanity solely through the "universal language" of mathematics and science. The second essay, "Beyond Linear B" by Richard Saint-Gelais, analyzes potential alien communication through a semiotic lens, commenting on the issues involved in interpreting the signs and symbols of a fundamentally different culture. He notes that the issues faced in semiotic challenges such as decoding an unknown human language may be even greater for an alien language. For instance, he describes how all known writing systems for human languages are either alphabetic, syllabic, or ideographic, and anthropologists are able to estimate which type an unknown system is by its number of characters, which may not be a shared assumption for an extraterrestrial writing system.

"Learning to Read" focuses on the hypothetical alien translation of interstellar messages transmitted by humanity. Its author Kathryn E. Denning deems the task of writing alien-translatable messages "neither trivial nor impossible", considering it a difficult task but one worthy of study; she discusses the need for interdisciplinary study to produce such messages, with important work from fields such as cryptography and anthropology. She also discusses the polarized views of natural and social sciences on the issue of alien translation, with natural scientists tending to take far more optimistic perspectives of the ease of translation than social scientists. "Inferring Intelligence" by Paul K. Wason describes the difficulty of understanding the work of prehistoric cultures and compares this difficulty to that of understanding the work of extraterrestrial cultures. He refers to the controversy regarding the meaning of Paleolithic cave art, as well as the relative recency of identifying stone tools as the intentional productions of intelligent beings.

==== "Anthropology, Culture, and Communication" ====
John W. Traphagan has two essays in this section, "Anthropology at a Distance" and "Culture and Communication with Extraterrestrial Intelligence". In the former, he draws comparison between the "anthropology at a distance" practice of anthropologists in the early nineteenth century, who often lacked the resources to perform fieldwork with the societies they studied, and the practice of SETI in discussing and studying uncontacted extraterrestrials. The latter focuses on the concept of hypothetical "universal languages", such as music or mathematics, and the differences human and alien cultures may have in their interpretation of these languages.

"Contact Considerations" by Douglas Raybeck considers human-alien interaction through comparison to terrestrial colonial interactions. He gives the specific examples of European contact with Aztec, Japanese, Chinese, Iroquois, and Māori cultures, all five cultures being politically and technologically complex at the time of first European contact. He discusses the likely significance of trade to human-alien interactions, both for goods and services exchanged in trade between human cultures, but potentially also for things such as music that may not exist in an alien culture. In "Speaking for Earth", Albert A. Harrison discusses the development, longevity, and potential consequences of projecting interstellar messages. He takes an optimistic position of the benevolence of extraterrestrial civilizations, referring to his own anthropological research that shows societies that endure for long periods tend to be more peaceful and less aggressive. Harrison supports Active SETI, the process of actively transmitting messages from Earth to potential interstellar societies, and discusses planned and actual attempts at it.

==== "The Evolution and Embodiment of Extraterrestrials" ====
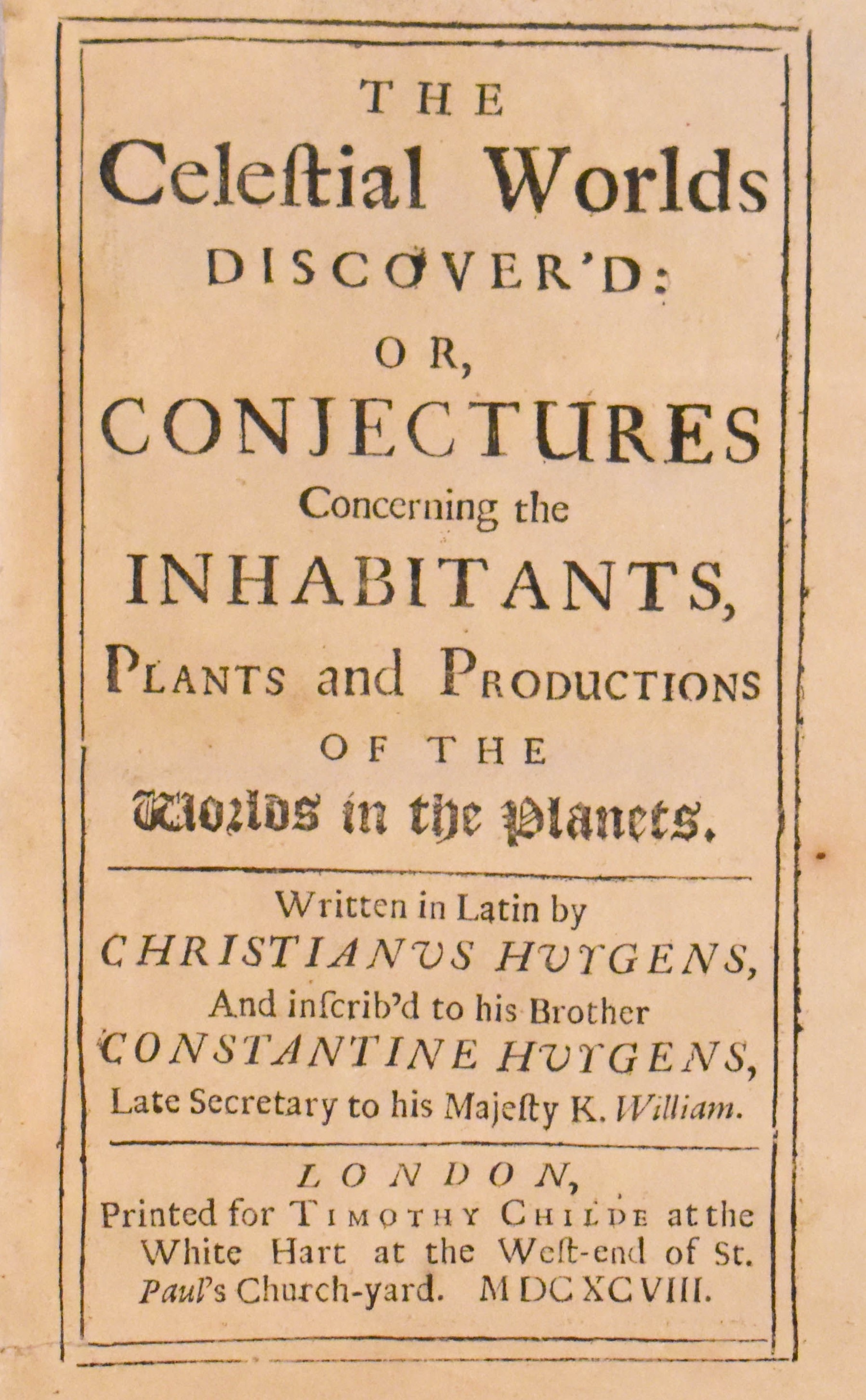
Title page for The Celestial Worlds Discover'd (Christiaan Huygens, 1698), one of the subjects of Vakoch's "The Evolution of Extraterrestrials"

Vakoch's chapter, "The Evolution of Extraterrestrials", focuses on hypotheses of what an alien intelligence would look like, such as whether it would be humanoid or nonhumanoid. He discusses how as early as The Celestial Worlds Discover'd, published by Christiaan Huygens in 1698 and one of the first works to consider the lives of extraterrestrial beings, the possibility was raised that aliens would have similar body plans to humans (such as walking upright) but look radically different within such confines. Both arguments in favour of convergent evolution to a functionally humanoid form and divergent evolution to a radically inhuman form are summarized and considered.

"Biocultural Prerequisites for the Development of Interstellar Communication" by Garry Chick discusses the Drake equation, a means by which to estimate the number of extraterrestrial civilizations in the Milky Way galaxy capable of communicating with humans. Referring to statements by figures such as the author Michael Crichton that the parameters in the Drake equation are unknowable, and that this casts foundational doubt on the validity of SETI, Chick aims to narrow the range of possible estimates for these parameters. In "Ethology, Ethnology, and Communication with Extraterrestrial Intelligence", Lestel considers the philosophical definition of 'communication' in the context of human-alien contact. He holds that contact between terrestrial and extraterrestrial societies would have traits of both ethnology, the study of other human cultures, and ethology, the study of animal behavior. In the book's final essay, "Constraints on Message Construction for Communication with Extraterrestrial Intelligence", William H. Edmondson summarizes the issue of designing messages to be understood by extraterrestrial societies. He notes the assumptions involved in constructing interstellar messages, such as that aliens will have senses and that aspects of cognitive function (e.g. intentional behavior) will be shared between all intelligent organisms.

== Publication history ==
Vakoch is a professor emeritus of clinical psychology at the California Institute of Integral Studies and a self-described exo-semiotician whose research interests include psychology, comparative religion, and the philosophy of science. He is the Director of Interstellar Message Composition at the SETI Institute. In a 2002 interview with Dennis Overbye for The New York Times, he discussed his criticism of the natural sciences focus of SETI research and his work to view the subject through a humanities-focused lens, including the comparison of interstellar communication to cross-cultural interactions between terrestrial societies. One of Vakoch's goals in compiling and editing Archaeology, Anthropology, and Interstellar Communication was to highlight less optimistic perspectives on interstellar communications from such fields, addressing concerns about significant inferential gaps that had been neglected by the physical sciences.

NASA intended to publish Archaeology, Anthropology, and Interstellar Communication in both print and e-book form on 10 June 2014. On 21 May, a PDF file of the book was accidentally published on NASA's website and picked up by Gizmodo. The PDF was taken down rapidly after Gizmodo published a review, with the intention of re-releasing it on the originally intended date, but demand for copies was so high that the publication was accelerated; MOBI, EPUB, and PDF versions were officially released on 22 May and made freely available online. A paperback edition was published in September 2014 and a hardcover edition was published that December. The collection was published by NASA's History Program Office, part of the Public Outreach Division of its Office of Communications, under the NASA History Series imprint.

== Cultural impact and reception ==
Perhaps all this attention towards a misinterpretation of a single sentence of this book—be it from negligence by bloggers rushing to meet a daily quota of posts, or a deliberate effort to drive traffic and advertising dollars—is instructive. At the very least, it helped publicize an interesting book to an audience that might otherwise never have heard of it. Moreover, it unwittingly demonstrates the challenges of interstellar communications: what hope do we have of deciphering any signal from an extraterrestrial intelligence if we can't clearly communicate with each other in our own language?

— Jeff Foust, The Space Review

Gizmodo described Archaeology, Anthropology, and Interstellar Communication as "truly fascinating stuff" that managed to be both complex and accessible. The review began with an out-of-context quote from William Edmondson's essay on how mysterious stone carvings "might have been made by aliens" as a metaphor for the difficulties in researching long-lost ancient societies. Though it went on to note that this should not be interpreted as a literal statement, the quote was picked up by publications such as Artnet, The Blaze, and The Huffington Post as a clickbait headline. Some of these articles noted that the statement was not representative of the essay's content; others took it at face value. The aerospace analyst Jeff Foust decried the phenomenon in his review, but noted its role in highlighting how difficult even communication between human beings of similar cultures can be.

Upon the book's official release, it received mostly positive reviews. Emily Gertz, writing for Popular Science, found it "refreshing" and compared the issues it raised to those explored by science fiction works such as The Sparrow, a novel about a Jesuit priest making contact with an alien civilization. Michael Franco of CNET lauded its comprehensiveness, and Jolene Creighton, co-founder of the science news site From Quarks to Quasars, called it "a fantastic text to save for a rainy day". Writing for The Daily Dot, Aja Romano commented that the book came from a thoroughly optimistic point of view about both the existence and benevolence of extraterrestrial intelligence, but that it provided thorough investigation into SETI and had a strong understanding of the subject it investigated. Mark Anderson, Chair of the Notable Documents Panel of the American Library Association's Government Documents Round Table and research librarian at the University of Northern Colorado, reviewed Archaeology, Anthropology, and Interstellar Communication for Library Journal alongside other books published by United States government offices. He highlighted the depth of the book's scholarship and its nonetheless accessible writing.

In June 2014, weeks after the book's official release, Joshua Rothman interviewed Vakoch for The New Yorker about the struggles of extraterrestrial communication. Vakoch explained the book's purpose, discussing the integral role archaeologists and anthropologists play in extraterrestrial research. He referred to the conclusions reached by the essayists, such as Lestel's discussion of the implications involved in being unable to understand or decode potential alien messages. Vakoch described the humanities perspective on extraterrestrial communication as increasingly "skeptical and critical", but "a criticism that engages, as opposed to a criticism that dismisses". He noted that although bridging the communication gap with an extraterrestrial civilization would be a difficult ask, the rapid discovery of exoplanets in the past decades increased the likelihood extraterrestrial intelligence would be identified, making the issue more relevant.
