= First Contact (Star Trek: The Next Generation) =

- Star Trek: The Next Generation episode
- Episode no.: Season 4 Episode 15
- Directed by: Cliff Bole
- Story by: Marc Scott Zicree
- Teleplay by: Dennis Russell Bailey; David Bischoff; Joe Menosky; Ronald D. Moore; Michael Piller
- Production code: 189
- Original air date: February 18, 1991

Guest appearances
- George Coe - Avel Durken; Carolyn Seymour - Mirasta Yale; George Hearn - Berel; Michael Ensign - Krola; Steven Anderson - Nilrem; Sachi Parker - Tava; Bebe Neuwirth - Lanel

Episode chronology
← Previous "Clues"	Next → "Galaxy's Child"
- Star Trek: The Next Generation season 4

"First Contact" is the 15th episode of the fourth season (and the 89th episode overall) of the American science fiction television series Star Trek: The Next Generation.

Set in the 24th century, the series follows the adventures of the Starfleet crew of the Federation starship Enterprise-D. In this episode, during an away mission to observe a pre-warp civilization, Commander Riker is injured and brought to a hospital, where the locals quickly realize he is not from their world. Despite the attempted intervention of the planet's sympathetic science minister, Picard and Troi's efforts to retrieve Riker are stymied by the government's concern about the social crisis that a widespread revelation of his presence could trigger.

== Plot ==
The humanoid race of Malcor III is preparing to develop warp drive technology. Captain Picard and Deanna Troi suddenly visit Science Minister Mirasta Yale, lead researcher on their warp experiments. They calm her and explain that they come in peace. It is normal Federation policy to make first contact with a world when it reaches this level of technology; however, they have had to move ahead of schedule because Riker, disguised as a Malcorian, has gone missing. After touring the USS Enterprise, Mirasta agrees to help and arranges a private meeting with Chancellor Durken. After the meeting, Picard returns with Durken to the Enterprise and explains the benefits of a relationship with the Federation. Durken expresses some concerns; most notably with the Federation's unwillingness to share their technology, as well as how their arrival will change his society. Picard assures him that how first contact proceeds will be up to him, and that the Federation will leave if asked to do so.

Meanwhile, Riker has been detained by security forces in a hospital, where he is barely conscious following an accident. Differences in Riker's physiology make the hospital administrator believe that he is an extraterrestrial. Riker is aided in his escape by Lanel, a nurse who expresses her wish to "make love with an alien". Riker accepts her offer, but the escape-attempt fails: he is spotted, and the guards catch and beat him, worsening his condition. Riker's presence at the hospital is reported to Security Minister Krola, who accuses Durken of hiding the truth about the "alien" presence. The Chancellor expresses his concerns to Picard about the Federation's covert intrusions, but accepts Picard's explanation of why the Federation does this. Krola, fearing a hostile invasion by the Federation, endangers Riker's health by reviving him prematurely so he may be interrogated. He tries to frame Riker as a murderer by shooting himself with Riker's phaser. Meanwhile, Durken is made aware that Riker is in danger of dying and tells Picard where he is. The Enterprise crew bring both Riker and Krola back to the ship. They are able to save Riker's life, and discover that his phaser was only set to stun, so Krola was in no real danger.

After Krola is returned to the planet, Durken regretfully tells Picard that he feels Malcor is not ready for first contact. He fears his people are not mature enough to handle the startling announcement that they are not alone in the universe. He requests that the Enterprise leave the planet, in hopes that they may be able to return at a later time. He agrees to delay Malcor's development of warp-drive technology until its people are ready. With Mirasta's project cancelled, she asks Picard if she can board Enterprise and leave Malcor for a new life in the Federation. Both Durken and Picard agree to her request.

== Reception ==
The episode ranked eighth in Entertainment Weekly's list of top 10 Star Trek: The Next Generation episodes. In 2016, The Washington Post ranked "First Contact" the tenth best episode of all Star Trek television. They highlight a cameo by Bebe Neuwirth, amidst complications when Riker is lost on a First Contact mission to the nearly warp-capable Malcorians.

In 2017, Den of Geek ranked Neuwirth as one of the top ten guest stars on Star Trek: The Next Generation. In 2017, Business Insider listed this episode as one of the most underrated episodes of the Star Trek franchise.

In 2020, Screen Rant ranked "First Contact" the 15th best episode of Star Trek: The Next Generation. They note how this episode excels at "world building the Star Trek fictional universe, exploring its hallmark Starfleet, United Federation of Planets and alien contact concepts."

== Home video ==
This episode was released in the United States on September 3, 2002, as part of the Star Trek: The Next Generation season four DVD box set.

On May 28, 1996, episodes "First Contact" and "Galaxy's Child" were released on LaserDisc in the United States. Published by Paramount Home Video, the single 12" double sided disc retailed for 34.95 USD. The disc video was NTSC format with a Dolby Surround audio track.

This episode was streamed for free on April 5, 2021, as part of the First Contact Day event on Startrek.com, along with several other episodes and roundtable discussions with Star Trek actors.

== See also ==
- "Who Watches the Watchers", a first contact–related plot line in episode 4 of season 3 of Star Trek: The Next Generation
- First contact (disambiguation)
