= First Contact Day =

April 5th Star Trek-themed observance

- Observed by: Star Trek fans
- Type: Secular
- Significance: Celebrating Star Trek
- Date: April 5
- Next time: April 5, 2027
- Frequency: Annual
- First time: 1997
- Related to: Star Trek Day

First Contact Day is an informal commemorative day observed annually on April 5 to celebrate the Star Trek media franchise.

== Fictional depiction ==
In the fictional Star Trek universe, as depicted in the 1996 film Star Trek: First Contact, April 5, 2063, is the day of first contact between humans and aliens, specifically the Vulcans. The date was chosen by screenwriter Ronald D. Moore, and was based on his eldest son's birthday.

== Celebrations ==
Paramount, the owners of the Star Trek franchise, hosts a number of celebratory initiatives including virtual events and panels annually on First Contact Day. Fans, or Trekkies as they are termed, take to social media and use the hashtag #FirstContactDay, generally causing it to trend each year.

The keel of the USS Enterprise (CVN-80), a Gerald R. Ford-class aircraft carrier, was laid on 5 April 2022.

== See also ==
- Star Trek Day on September 8
