= Albert Harrison (psychologist) =

Albert ('"Al") Harrison (1940–2015), was a professor emeritus of psychology at the University of California, Davis whose research focused on how the discovery of extraterrestrial life would impact human society.

Harrison argued that it would be “foolish and negligent” to fail to anticipate nativist and extremist reactions by humanity against extraterrestrial life in the formulation of post-detection policies and plans.

Harrison also thought and wrote on the potential cultural impact of extraterrestrial contact, arguing that a highly advanced civilization might teach humanity such things as a physical theory of everything, how to use zero-point energy, or how to travel faster than light.
