= Richard C. Hoagland =

American conspiracy theorist (born 1945)

- Born: Richard Charles Hoagland; April 25, 1945 (age 81); Morristown, New Jersey, U.S.
- Known for: Advocating his beliefs in advanced ancient civilizations colonizing the Solar System; accusations of corruption of NASA and U.S. government
- Notable work: The Monuments of Mars: A City on the Edge of Forever
- Awards: International Angstrom Medal for Excellence in Science, 1993. (Note: A private award presented to Hoagland by Lars-Jonas Ångström in Washington, D.C., August 1993; not to be confused with the long-established Ångström's Prize (Ångströms premium), awarded yearly by professors at Uppsala University to physics students.); Ig Nobel Prize for Astronomy, 1997.

Richard Charles Hoagland (born April 25, 1945) is an American author, former science advisor for CBS News and a proponent of various conspiracy theories about NASA, lost alien civilizations on the Moon, and on Mars and other related topics. Hoagland has been documented to misappropriate others' professional achievements and has been described as a conspiracy theorist and pseudoscientist.

== Background ==
Hoagland has no education beyond the high school level. According to Hoagland's curriculum vitae, he has no advanced training, schooling, or degrees in any scientific field. Hoagland asserts he was a Curator of Astronomy and Space Science at the Springfield Science Museum, 1964–1967, and assistant director at the Gengras Science Center (Note: The Children's Museum, formerly The Science Center of Connecticut, is home to the Gengras Planetarium.) in West Hartford, Connecticut, 1967–1968, and was a Science Advisor to CBS News during the Apollo program, 1968–1971. In July 1968, Hoagland filed a copyright registration for a planetarium presentation and show script called The Grand Tour.

A popular planetarium lecturer at the Springfield Science Museum, Hoagland produced a program called "Mars: Infinity to 1965" to coincide with the Mariners 3 and 4 missions. He designed a room with special equipment to display the relative positions of the Earth, Mars, and the Mariners during their trip and thereafter contracted with NASA to relay the pictures of the Martian surface, on a near-live-feed, to the general audience. Hoagland co-hosted a radio program for WTIC (AM) in Hartford, Connecticut, The Night of the Encounter, along with Dick Bertel, covering the July 14, 1965 Mariner 4 flyby of the planet Mars. Local newspapers had noted the radio broadcast to be history's first laser audio transmission.

In 1976, Hoagland, an avid Star Trek fan, initiated a letter-writing campaign that successfully persuaded President Gerald Ford to name the first Space Shuttle the Enterprise, replacing the previously slated name for the prototype vehicle, Constitution. (Note: In "Why 'Enterprise?'", The Enterprise Mission credits the 1976 Space Shuttle letter-writing campaign as being "organized by Richard C. Hoagland and a small group of associates, including White House consultant, Jerome Glenn." Glenn is the co-founder and Director of The Millennium Project, a think tank. His résumé posted on his organization's website mentions that he was "instrumental in naming the first Space Shuttle the Enterprise.")

Hoagland authored the book The Monuments of Mars: A City on the Edge of Forever (published in 1987) and co-authored the book Dark Mission: The Secret History of NASA, which was ranked 21st on November 18, 2007, on The New York Times Best Seller list for paperback nonfiction. Richard Grossinger, the founder of North Atlantic Books, writes that Monuments became the most successful title published by North Atlantic, and that at its peak the book sold over 2000 copies per month. Grossinger also reports that Hoagland wrote much of the book while in Los Angeles County jail.

Hoagland runs the Enterprise Mission website, and has described the Enterprise Mission as "an independent NASA watchdog and research group ... attempting to figure out how much of what NASA has found in the solar system over the past 50 years has actually been silently filed out of sight as classified material, and therefore totally unknown to the American people."

Hoagland appeared regularly as the "Science Advisor" for Coast to Coast AM, a late-night radio talk show, until being replaced by Robert Zimmerman in July 2015.

While Hoagland makes frequent reference to his receipt of the "International Angstrom Medal for Excellence in Science" in August 1993, the organization that awarded the medal, The Angstrom Foundation Aktiebolag, founded by Lars-Jonas Ångström, was not authorized by Uppsala University or the Royal Swedish Academy of Sciences to make use of the academy's Anders Jonas Ångström memorial medal. The academy has long authorized only Uppsala University to use its medal for the Ångström's Prize (Ångströms premium), awarded yearly by Uppsala professors to physics students. Mr. Ångström stated in May 2000 that although his award to Hoagland was a mistake, he acted with good faith and with good intentions.

== Claims by Hoagland ==
Hoagland claims the source of a so-called NASA "coverup", with relation to the "Face on Mars" and other related structures, is the result of a report commissioned by NASA authored by the Brookings Institution, the so-called Brookings Report. Hoagland claimed that page 216 of the 1960 report, "Proposed Studies on the Implications of Peaceful Space Activities for Human Affairs", instructed NASA to deliberately withhold from the public any evidence it may find of extraterrestrial activity, specifically on the Moon, Mars, or Venus.

Hoagland has also proposed a form of physics he calls "hyperdimensional physics", which he claims represents a more complete implementation of James Clerk Maxwell's original 20 quaternion equations, instead of the original Maxwell's equations as amended by Oliver Heaviside commonly taught today. The mainstream physics community rejects these ideas as unfounded.

Hoagland claims the "Face on Mars" is part of a city built on Cydonia Planitia consisting of colossal pyramids and mounds arranged in a geometric pattern, indicative of an advanced civilization that once existed on Mars. His book Dark Mission purports to "carefully document" how "NASA has been quite consciously, deliberately and methodically concealing from the American people and the world for all these years" the "staggering truth ... [that it was not aliens but rather] ... our own ... ancestors ... who [eons ago] lived ... and built ... and walked amid" that city (emphasis in original) — ditto the Moon. In the years since its discovery, the "Face" has been near-universally accepted as an optical illusion, an example of the psychological phenomenon of pareidolia. Similar optical illusions can be found in the geology of Earth; examples include the Old Man of the Mountain, the Pedra da Gávea, and Stac Levenish. Some astronauts, NASA photo analysts and others have attributed his alleged Moon artifacts to photo processing defects and grainy/fuzzy spots (susceptible to pareidolia) resulting from excessive photo magnification.

Although the Pioneer 10 plaque was designed entirely by Carl Sagan, Linda Salzman Sagan, and Frank Drake, Hoagland has inaccurately claimed to have co-created the plaque with Eric Burgess, as in 1990 when asserting that "Carl for many years has been taking public credit for the Pioneer plaque which, of course, Eric Burgess and I conceived." Later that year, Hoagland went so far as to claim he designed the plaque when he said, "Carl... was involved with Eric Burgess and me in the design of [the] message." Burgess' account is at odds with Hoagland's design claims, stating that "The design itself was created by Carl Sagan and Frank Drake, with the artistic help of Sagan’s then-wife Linda Salzman Sagan", without mentioning Hoagland at all. Sagan's correspondence regarding the matter also contradicts Hoagland's claims, specifically saying "he did not contribute one bit of data towards the message design." Burgess recalls similarly, adding that all Hoagland did concerning the plaque "was support me and say it's a good idea." Yet Hoagland's website continues to credit him as "co-creator of the 'Pioneer Plaque.'"

== Responses by scientists ==
Many scientists have responded to Hoagland's claims and assertions. Professional astronomer Phil Plait described Hoagland as a pseudoscientist and his claims as ridiculous. Plait has also criticized Hoagland for having no university degree. Prof. Ralph Greenberg asserted that the logic of Hoagland's deductions from the geometry of Cydonia Mensae is flawed and says that he is not a trained scientist in any sense. The claim that the crashing of the Galileo orbiter into Jupiter caused a "mysterious black spot" on the planet has since been disputed by both NASA and Plait. There is photographic evidence that a similar "black spot" was present in imagery of Jupiter taken in 1998. A second image referenced by Plait shows a dark ring that looks similar to the spot Hoagland cited. In 1995, Malin Space Science Systems, NASA prime contractor for planetary imaging, published a paper critiquing claims that the "city" at Cydonia is artificial, the claimed mathematical relationships, and – very specifically – denying any claims about concealing questionable data from the public.

In October 1997, Hoagland received the Ig Nobel Prize for Astronomy "for identifying artificial features on the moon and on Mars, including a human face on Mars and ten-mile-high buildings on the far side of the moon." The prize is given for outlandish or "trivial" contributions to science.

== Publications ==
=== Books ===
- Hoagland, Richard C. (2002). The Monuments of Mars: A City on the Edge of Forever (5th ed.). Berkeley: Frog, Ltd. ISBN 978-1-58394-054-9.
- Hoagland, Richard C.; Bara, Mike (2009). Dark Mission: The Secret History of NASA, Revised and Expanded Edition. Port Townsend: Feral House. ISBN 978-1-932595-48-2.
- Hoagland, Richard C. (2015). Grossinger, Richard (ed.). New Horizon ... for a Lost Horizon, chapter in : Pluto: New Horizons for a Lost Horizon. North Atlantic Books. p. 312. ISBN 978-1583948972.

=== Contributions, introductions, forewords ===
- Hoagland, Richard C.; Bova, Ben (1977). "The origin of the solar system". In Bova, Ben; Bell, Trudy E. (eds.). Closeup: new worlds. Chapter by Richard C. Hoagland and Ben Bova. New York: St. Martin's Press. Bibcode:1977cnw..book.....B. ISBN 978-0-312-14490-6.
- Haas, George J.; Saunders, William R. (2005). The Cydonia Codex: Reflections from Mars. Forewords by Mark J. Carlotto and Richard C. Hoagland. Frog Books. ISBN 978-1-58394-121-8.
- NASA (2011) [1972]. "The Moon". In Hoagland, Richard C. (ed.). NASA Apollo Spacecraft Lunar Excursion Module News Reference. Chapter by Richard C. Hoagland. Periscope Film LLC. ISBN 978-1-937684-98-3.

=== Videos ===
- Hoagland, Richard C. (Author (with NASA Lewis Research Center)) (1990). Monuments of Mars: City on the Edge of Forever (VHS tape). Cleveland, OH: NASA Lewis Research Center. OCLC 23350482.
- Hoagland, Richard C. (Executive Producer, Writer (with Geline, Robert J.)) (1992). The Monuments of Mars: A Terrestrial Connection (VHS tape). New York: BC Video Inc. OCLC 41520112.
- Hoagland, Richard C. (1996). Hoagland's Mars, Vol. 1, The NASA-Cydonia Briefings (VHS tape). Venice, CA: UFO Central Home Video. OCLC 41559991. "Short version, revised and updated"
- Hoagland, Richard C. (2008). The Hyperdimensional Election of Barack Obama and 2012 (DVD). The Enterprise Mission.
- Hoagland, Richard C. (Disk 1: "The Gods of Cydonia: The Case for Ancient Artificial Structures in the Solar System") (2005). God, Man and ET: The Question of Other Worlds in Science, Theology, and Mythology (DVD). Venice, CA: Knowledge 2020 Media. OCLC 58528205.
- Hoagland, Richard C. (March 21, 1990). Videotaped guest presentation (untitled) at the NASA Lewis (now Glenn) Research Center, Cleveland, Ohio, about the allegedly artificial "Face" and other "Monuments of Mars"

== See also ==
- List of Ig Nobel Prize winners
