= Douglas Vakoch =

American pro-contact astrobiologist (born 1961)

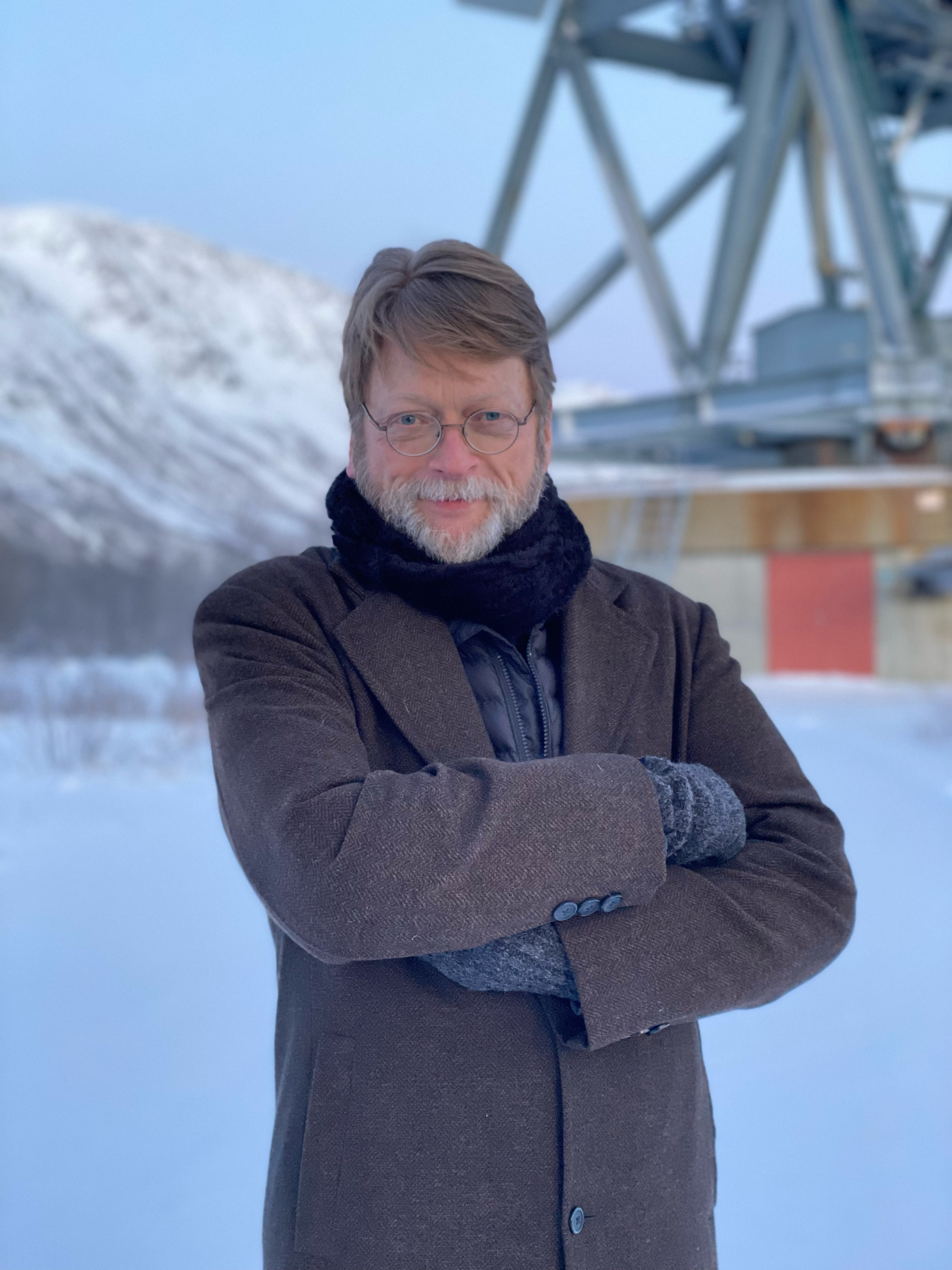
- Born: Douglas A. Vakoch; June 16, 1961 (age 65); Minnesota, U.S.
- Education: Carleton College (BA); University of Notre Dame (MA); Stony Brook University (PhD)
- Known for: METI, SETI, Astrobiology
- Scientific career
- Fields: SETI, Interstellar message composition, Psychology, Ecocriticism
- Website: meti.org/board/douglas-vakoch

Douglas A. Vakoch (/ˈvɑːˌkoʊtʃ/ VAH-kohtch; born June 16, 1961) is an American astrobiologist, search for extraterrestrial intelligence (SETI) researcher, psychologist, and president of METI International, a nonprofit research and educational organization devoted to transmitting intentional signals to extraterrestrial civilizations.

== Early life and education ==
Douglas Vakoch grew up in rural Minnesota. He created his first interstellar message as a high school student—a series of two-dimensional pictures that built upon a message transmitted from Arecibo Observatory in 1974. "The issue that really hit me early on, and that has stayed with me, is just the challenge of creating a message that would be understandable," he told The New York Times Magazine. Vakoch earned a bachelor's degree in comparative religion from Carleton College, a master's degree in history and philosophy of science from the University of Notre Dame, and a PhD in psychology from Stony Brook University. He completed a postdoctoral fellowship at Vanderbilt University before he accepted a position at the SETI Institute in Mountain View, California.

== Active Search for Extraterrestrial Intelligence (Active SETI) ==
Vakoch argues that in order to make contact, humankind may need to take the initiative in transmitting, a project called active SETI. He has been called "a prominent voice in favor of active SETI," "the most prominent METI [messaging to extraterrestrial intelligence] proponent," and "the man who speaks for Earth." In Discover's ranking of scientists either in favor of or opposed to transmitting, Vakoch was cited as "super pro," at the extreme of those advocating messaging. After sixteen years at the SETI Institute, where he was director of Interstellar Message Composition, Vakoch founded METI (Messaging Extraterrestrial Intelligence), a nonprofit research and educational organization.

== Passive SETI ==
In 2010, Vakoch was one of the leaders of Project Dorothy, a multinational effort launched by Japanese astronomer Shin-ya Narusawa to observe several stars for signals from other civilizations to commemorate the fiftieth anniversary of Project Ozma, the first modern-day search for extraterrestrial intelligence (SETI). Telling The Washington Post about the Project Dorothy observations, Vakoch said "[w]hat this weekend really does is begin the process of making it possible to track a possible SETI signal around the globe," and he added "[i]f a signal is detected, it has to be confirmed and followed, and now we're setting up a network to do that."

Vakoch contends that it is essential to expand an understanding of SETI beyond the technology needed to search by also re-examining assumptions about the nature of intelligence, which was the motivation for the METI workshop, “The Intelligence of SETI: Cognition and Communication in Extraterrestrial Intelligence,” held in San Juan, Puerto Rico on May 18, 2016. "By studying the variety of intelligence found on Earth," Vakoch said, "we can gain new insights into sending messages to life on other planets." Vakoch told the International Business Times that "[i]n this new approach, we're putting the intelligence back into SETI." He argues that the fact that extraterrestrial intelligence may rely on different senses than humans adds to the complexity of interspecies communication.

== Interstellar message design ==
The cover of Archaeology, Anthropology, and Interstellar Communication, written by Vakoch and published by NASA

Vakoch "leads an international group of scientists, artists and scholars from the humanities, as they ponder how we could communicate what it’s like to be human across the vast distances of interstellar space." He advocates creating interstellar messages that begin with concepts shared by humans and extraterrestrials, such as basic mathematics and science and building on these shared concepts to express content that may be distinctly human. He argues that while mathematics and science provide the best starting point for interstellar messages, it is possible that extraterrestrial mathematics and science may vary significantly from human mathematics and science. He notes that on Earth both Euclidean and non-Euclidean geometries provide internally consistent frameworks for understanding the world, but they vary in their foundational assumptions.

In contrast to the images included on the Voyager Golden Record that emphasized the positive aspects of life on Earth, Vakoch proposes that we should be honest about human frailties. He suggests that the most informative things that humankind can convey to an advanced civilization are the struggles humankind is going through as an adolescent technological civilization. Vakoch argues that if we contact other civilizations, they will likely be thousands or millions of years older than humanity's civilization, meaning the extraterrestrial civilization would have greater stability. "If we wish to convey what it is about us that is distinctive, it may be our weakness, our fears, our unknowing – and yet a willingness to forge ahead to attempt contact in spite of this," Vakoch told The Psychologist.

Vakoch calls for increasing the range of people participating in interstellar message design, and he led a workshop in Paris in 2002 on the interface of art and science in interstellar messages. Speaking to Reuters on the day of the meeting, he said "Today the focus has been on whether we can explain something about our aesthetic sensibilities. Is there something about art that is either universal or that can be taught...?"

In 2020, he delivered the TEDx Talk Don't Be Afraid of Messaging Extraterrestrial Intelligence at TEDxNormal.

Vakoch also led meetings attended by anthropologists and sociologists, and he advocates interstellar messages that capture the diversity of human cultures.

== Space exploration ==
Vakoch has contributed to the study of space exploration, most notably through books examining psychological dimensions of space travel. The Journal of Military History noted about Vakoch's edited book Psychology of Space Exploration: Contemporary Research in Historical Perspective that "[m]ost interestingly to those whose primary interest lies in history, many of the chapters engage the history of the psychology of space exploration quite well." Aviation, Space, and Environmental Medicine observed that "[i]t is certainly worthwhile reading for those directly involved in the next phase of human exploration of space as well as those who will witness this phase from the confines of Earth." Isis wrote that "[t]his diverse and thought-provoking collection represents an important departure for the NASA History Series, a turn from works focused on machines, missions, and management structures to a concern with the smaller group of space sciences interested in human subjects, like space medicine and human factors engineering" and noted that the book "represents an important step in bringing the human-focused space sciences to the attention of a wider audience."

The Journal of Mind and Behavior noted that Vakoch's follow-up book On Orbit and Beyond: Psychological Perspectives on Human Spaceflight includes several chapters that address the implications of the increased autonomy that astronauts would have on missions to Mars and Saturn, as compared to orbiting Earth or travelling to the Moon. In an interview Vakoch explained the implications of this increased autonomy: "On missions to Mars, where greater autonomy will be expected of astronauts because of the greater distances, ground personnel should expect that their own roles will change over the course of the mission."

At the 2008 annual convention of the American Psychological Association, Vakoch chaired the symposium "To the Moon and Mars: Psychology of Long-Duration Space Exploration," which was identified as a "highlight" of the convention.

Vakoch has also examined unmanned space exploration. Commenting on plans to send miniature spacecraft to a nearby star, he told the International Business Times that "[b]y sending hundreds or thousands of space probes the size of postage stamps, Breakthrough Starshot gets around the hazards of spaceflight that could easily end a mission relying on a single spacecraft. Only one nanocraft needs to make its way to Alpha Centauri and send back a signal for the mission to be successful."

Focusing within the Solar System, he commented on NASA's plans to send a lander to Jupiter's moon Europa, telling Gizmodo that "[t]he top priority of this lander mission will be to search for evidence of life on Europa," adding that "even if that main goal isn’t met, we will learn a great deal about the potential habitability of this icy moon." Along with colleagues from METI International, he collected 103 words for water in languages from around the world that were engraved on a metal plate attached to the Europa Clipper spacecraft, and he designed the graphic depiction of hydrogen and hydroxyl lines for the same plate that symbolize key radio frequencies that guided early SETI searches.

== Cognitive, cross-cultural, and clinical psychology ==
Vakoch has collaborated on several empirical studies of human cognition. His research in psycholinguistics with Lee Wurm explores the perception of speech and emotion from an evolutionary framework, with their findings indicating that "speech perception and the affective lexicon" are "closely tied together." Vakoch's experimental work with Yuh-Shiow Lee suggests that complex rules are learned better through implicit learning, while simple rules are learned better through explicit learning, with their research suggesting that "implicit learning can be more efficient than explicit learning." Vakoch and the late psychotherapy researcher Hans Herrman Strupp suggested that the expert understanding of experienced psychotherapists is not adequately captured by manualized psychotherapy, and they argued that manualized training can impede "the development of clinical judgment and complex reasoning."

== Recognition ==
- Vakoch was elected as a member of the International Institute of Space Law in 2002.
- In 2006 he was awarded a Leonardo da Vinci Space Art Award "for dedication to the language and codes for broader cosmic reception and communication and their broader cultural meanings."
- Vakoch was elected as a corresponding member of the International Academy of Astronautics in 2009.
- Vakoch is a member of the International Astronomical Union (IAU). Within the IAU, he is a member of Division B (Facilities, Technologies and Data Science), Division C (Education, Outreach and Heritage), Division F (Planetary Systems and Bioastronomy), Commission B4 (Radio Astronomy), Commission C2 (Communicating Astronomy with the Public), and Commission F3 (Astrobiology).

== Filmography ==
Date	Film	As	Video Link
2008	Calling E.T.	Himself	Trailer
2015	The Visit: An Alien Encounter	Himself, as Doug Vakoch, Director of Interstellar Message Composition, SETI Institute	Full film (in English), (in Italian) Trailer
2019	Earthling's Quest	Himself, as Douglas Vakoch, President, METI International	Trailer

== Selected bibliography ==
- Vakoch, D. A. (2011). Communication with extraterrestrial intelligence. Albany, State University of New York Press.
- Vakoch, D. A. (2011). Ecofeminism and rhetoric: critical perspectives on sex, technology, and discourse. New York, Berghahn Books.
- Vakoch, D. A. (2011). Psychology of space exploration: contemporary research in historical perspective. Washington, DC, National Aeronautics and Space Administration, Office of Communications, History Program Office.
- Vakoch, D. A. (2012). Feminist ecocriticism: environment, women, and literature. Lanham, MD, Lexington Books.
- Vakoch, D. A. (2013). Altruism in cross-cultural perspective. New York, Springer.
- Vakoch, D. A. (2013). Astrobiology, history and society: life beyond earth and the impact of discovery. Heidelberg, Springer Verlag.
- Vakoch, D. A. (2013). On orbit and beyond: psychological perspectives on human spaceflight. Heidelberg, Germany, Springer-Verlag.
- Vakoch, D. A. (2014). Archaeology, Anthropology, and Interstellar Communication. Washington, DC, National Aeronautics and Space Administration, Office of Communications, Public Outreach Division, History Program Office.
- Vakoch, D. A. (2014). Extraterrestrial altruism: evolution and ethics in the cosmos. Heidelberg [u.a.], Springer.
- Vakoch, D. A. (2020). Transecology: transgender perspectives on environment and nature. Abindgon, Oxon, Routledge.
- Vakoch, D. A. (2021). Dystopias and utopias on earth and beyond: feminist ecocriticism of science fiction. London, Routledge.
- Vakoch, D. A. (2021). Ecofeminist science fiction: international perspectives on gender, ecology, and literature. London, Routledge.
- Vakoch, D. A. (2022). Transgender India: understanding third gender identities and experiences. Cham, Switzerland, Springer.
- Vakoch, D. A. (2023). The Routledge handbook of ecofeminism and literature. London, Routledge.
- Vakoch, D. A., and Anae, N. (2022). Indian feminist ecocriticism. Lanham, MD, Lexington Books.
- Vakoch, D. A., & Castrillon, F. (2014). Ecopsychology, phenomenology, and the environment: the experience of nature. New York, Springer.
- Vakoch, D. A., & Dowd, M. F. (2015). The Drake equation: estimating the prevalence of extraterrestrial life through the ages. Cambridge, Cambridge University Press.
- Vakoch, D. A., & Harrison, A. A. (2011). Civilizations beyond earth: extraterrestrial life and society. New York, Berghahn Books.
- Vakoch, D. A., & Mickey, S. (2018). Ecofeminism in dialogue. Lanham, MD, Lexington Books.
- Vakoch, D. A., & Mickey, S. (2018). Literature and ecofeminism: intersectional and international voices. London, Routledge.
- Vakoch, D. A., & Mickey, S. (2018). Women and nature?: beyond dualism in gender, body, and environment. London, Routledge.
- Vakoch, D. A., & Mickey, S. (2022). Eco-anxiety and planetary hope: experiencing the twin disasters of Covid-19 and climate change. Cham, Switzerland, Springer.
- Vakoch, D. A., & Mickey, S. (2023). Eco-anxiety and pandemic distress: psychological perspectives on resilience and interconnectedness. Oxford, Oxford University Press.
- Vakoch, D. A., Pollock, J. C., & Caleb, A. M. (2023). COVID communication. Cham, Switzerland, Springer.
- Vakoch, D. A., & Punske, J. (2023). Xenolinguistics: Towards a science of extraterrestrial language. London, Routledge.
- Vakoch, D. A., & Sharp, S. (2024). The Routledge handbook of trans literature. London, Routledge,
