= Post-detection policy =

Code of conduct

A post-detection policy (PDP), also known as a post-detection protocol, is a set of structured rules, standards, guidelines, or actions that governmental or other organizational entities plan to follow for the "detection, analysis, verification, announcement, and response to" confirmed signals from extraterrestrial civilizations. Though no PDPs have been formally and openly adopted by any governmental entity, there is significant work being done by scientists and nongovernmental organizations to develop cohesive plans of action to utilize in the event of detection. The most popular and well known of these is the "Declaration of Principles Concerning Activities Following the Detection of Extraterrestrial Intelligence", which was developed by the International Academy of Astronautics (IAA), with the support of the International Institute of Space Law. The theories of PDPs constitute a distinct area of research but draw heavily from the fields of SETI (the Search for Extra-Terrestrial Intelligence), METI (Messaging to Extra-Terrestrial Intelligence), and CETI (Communication with Extraterrestrial Intelligence).

Scientist Zbigniew Paptrotny has argued that the formulation of post-detection protocols can be guided by three factors: terrestrial society's readiness to accept the news of ET detection, how the news of detection is released, and the comprehensibility of the message in the signal. These three broad areas and their related subsidiaries comprise the bulk of the content and discourse surrounding PDPs.

== Issues ==
=== Significance of transmission ===
There are two proposed scales for quantifying the significance of transmissions between Earth and potential extraterrestrial intelligence (ETI). The Rio scale, ranging from 0 to 10, was proposed in 2000 as a means of quantifying the significance of a SETI detection. The scale was designed by Iván Almár and Jill Tarter to help policy-makers formulate an initial judgment on a detection's potential consequences. The scale borrows heavily from the Torino Scale, which is used to categorize the hazard of impact of near-earth objects (NEOs). The IAA SETI Permanent Study Group officially adopted this scale both as a means of bringing perspective to claims of ETI detection and as an acknowledgement that even false ETI detections could have disastrous consequences, which should be mitigated.

A closely related metric is the San Marino Scale for quantifying potential hazard of deliberate transmissions from Earth. While the Rio scale rests on the relatively well-accepted science of the search for extraterrestrial signals (SETI), the San Marino scale seeks to bring objectivity to the reciprocal enterprise – that of human civilization sending transmissions that could be found by extraterrestrial civilizations (METI). The San Marino Scale was first proposed in 2005 and was adopted by the IAA SETI Permanent Study Group in September 2007.

=== Nature of detection ===
Despite widespread belief, there is no empirical knowledge concerning extraterrestrial life forms and civilizations. The implications of a detection of extraterrestrial life would vary greatly depending on the nature of that life, its location, and how human society reacts. Because of this lack of certainty, PDPs consider a variety of scenarios and the appropriate reactions. The formulation of a cohesive plan for a response to the detection of ETI would involve the development of scenario-contingent strategies for managing the discovery and its consequences.

Some scenarios have received more attention than have others. For example, while a sizable amount of work has been done to predict the consequences of a radio telescope detection of ETI elsewhere in our galaxy, very little such effort has been used to identify the consequences of discovering single-celled life forms elsewhere in the Solar System. Confirmation of such fossilized or living organisms on a nearby planet or moon could still have profound effects on individuals’ world-views and raise many ethical and practical issues.

=== Cultural and political considerations ===
Regardless of the nature of a confirmed detection, PDPs also place considerable emphasis on the range of likely reactions from different constituencies, including the press, various religious groups, political leaders, and the general public. The differences in reactions across the range of cultural and religious boundaries would be substantial. One possible strategy for development of more comprehensive PDPs is to undertake carefully planned cross-cultural polls and other empirical studies based on analogues in the humanities and history, the social and behavioral sciences, and even science fiction to determine likely reactions. Shortly after a confirmed detection, the timely application of relevant interdisciplinary data is likely to prove invaluable in implementing the appropriate policy as well as in the delivery of educational and public relations initiatives particular to the situation at hand. Another potential strategy is to explore the capacity of religion as a "resource to absorb the impact of discovery and to maintain beneficial relations with ETI."

PDPs also attempt to take into account the political aftermath of a detection and the ways in which both governmental and nongovernmental entities might use information. As Michael Michaud states, "We cannot assume that SETI is immune from the ancient motivations of egoism, power, and greed. Decisions that could affect the welfare of the human species might be made by small, non-representative elites."

Once detection becomes public, decision-makers would exert influence by the way they evaluate the importance and handle the publicity of the discovery. It is possible that such actors would emphasize or minimize its importance to extract political advantage. The contact could be framed as a positive development that will benefit the nation and humankind. Likewise, it could be used to warn of potential dangers and provoke public anxieties. Each course of action would have profound effects on how the press and the general public react. Michaud posits that the more decipherable the information received from contact with ETI, the higher a chance there is for political reaction against alien cultural influences. Extremist groups, both religious and secular, could weigh in, attacking information from ETI as evil or immoral. It is possible that this would spark attempts to terminate communication by interfering with the signal or targeting the detecting technology with attacks. Albert Harrison has written that it would be "foolish and negligent" to fail to anticipate such reactions in the formulation of policies and plans.

=== Information sharing ===
Following a confirmed detection, another important variable considered in a PDP is the speed with which the facts of the discovery would become public knowledge. For instance, should a signal of ET origin be sufficiently ambiguous or otherwise difficult to interpret, the detecting party may perceive a need to withhold information about the discovery to prevent unintended reactions from the general public or other political entities. Likewise, the detecting party could choose to limit information release in a bid to exploit the contact for personal gain.

At the international level, the PDP of a national government entity would have the force of law to prevent, delay, or limit the release of information – especially if the detection is made by persons working for that agency or under government contract. This sort of information restriction scenario is more likely under circumstances in which the detecting party was the only holder of the technological capabilities required to communicate. The subsequent disclosure of those decisions could provoke international distrust, encouraging other nations to act unilaterally in their communication with ETI.

=== Signal comprehensibility and content ===
Depending on the nature of the first detection, policy- or decision-makers might have the opportunity to make a conscious decision about composing and sending a message. The ambiguity and content of signals sent both to and from Earth would have profound implications for what actions needed to be taken. A PDP that did not take signal comprehensibility into account would not be flexible enough to inform appropriate action. The area of SETI research known as CETI (Communication with Extraterrestrial Intelligence), is concerned with how humankind should carry out this communication and, to some extent, representation problems such as whether a response should be with one collective voice or if anyone with access to a transmitter should have the right to communicate.

The purpose and content of a response is also an issue that PDPs seek to make explicit. There is considerable disagreement as to how to effectively communicate meaning and intent across what would likely be formidable language barriers. The message would need to be crafted in such a way that its content and delivery were unambiguous to receivers that may not even use written or verbal communication. Several mathematic, pictorial, algorithmic, and "natural" language theories have been developed and applied to the problem of CETI. A specific purpose or goal of outgoing transmissions may be covered by a PDP as well. Several possible functions exist, including: a description of our species and planet, a request for information, and/or the proposition of some course of action. However, in the absence of an intergovernmental agreement or structures for building consensus on the subject, nations, groups, businesses and individuals are free to act autonomously. It is precisely because the process of sculpting a collective message would be slow and laborious (but intensely important), that most scientists recommend having a PDP with some prescribed action laid out before contact is made.

=== Relative technological capabilities ===
In considering post-detection courses of action, it is also useful to consider the relative technological capabilities both in relation to signal relay time and in relation to whether or not the ETI is thought to pose a militaristic threat. If the ETI in question is transmitting from outside the Solar System, there will be a significant lag in time between transmission and receipt by either party. The relative sophistication of the communication technology available to each party would play heavily into the feasibility of certain types and content of messaging. In a similar vein, the potential disparities in sophistication of weapons technology hold grave implications for how humankind should react to ETI. Due to the perceived risk of revealing the precise location of the Earth to alien civilizations, METI has been heavily criticized as irresponsible considering the lack of information available about any real or potential ETI threat. Even in the likely scenario that accurate locational coordinates of Earth were available, there is question as to whether humankind should reveal anything more about itself that could be a boon to hostile ETI. Notable among the critics of METI were the (late) British theoretical physicist Stephen Hawking and includes science fiction author David Brin.

== Adopted and proposed PDPs ==
=== The Brookings Report ===
"Proposed Studies on the Implications of Peaceful Space Activities for Human Affairs," often referred to as "the Brookings Report," was a 1960 report commissioned by NASA and created by the Brookings Institution in collaboration with NASA's Committee on Long-Range Studies. In a section titled, "The implications of a discovery of extraterrestrial life," the report considers possible post-detection scenarios and gives recommendations. Aimed at the political leadership that would be in a decision-making role immediately following a confirmed detection, it describes, among other things, the circumstances under which it may or may not be advisable to withhold such information from the public. The significance of this relatively small section of the report is a matter of controversy. As more of an analysis of fallout and pertinent considerations than an explicit PDP, the report does not specifically recommend a cover-up of evidence of extraterrestrial life. This possibility, however, is the context in which the Brookings report is often cited by ufologists and conspiracy theorists.

=== IAA SETI Declaration of Principles ===
The IAA, in an attempt to draw up universal guidelines on the immediate steps to be taken by the group or individual that makes a discovery, drafted the "Declaration of Principles Concerning Activities Following the Detection of Extraterrestrial Intelligence". The document has been endorsed by six international professional space societies and also constitutes an informal agreement among most of those carrying out SETI. The declaration proposes a set of nine post-detection protocols, listed below.

1. International consultations should be initiated to consider the question of sending communications to extraterrestrial civilizations.
2. Consultations on whether a message should be sent, and its content, should take place within the Committee on the Peaceful Uses of Outer Space of the United Nations and within other governmental and non-governmental organizations, and should accommodate participation by qualified, interested groups that can contribute constructively to these consultations.
3. These consultations should be open to participation by all interested States and should be intended to lead to recommendations reflecting a consensus.
4. The United Nations General Assembly should consider making the decision on whether or not to send a message to extraterrestrial intelligence, and on what the content of that message should be, based on recommendations from the Committee on the Peaceful Uses of Outer Space and from governmental and non-governmental organizations.
5. If a decision is made to send a message to extraterrestrial intelligence, it should be sent on behalf of all Humankind, rather than from individual States.
6. The content of such a message should reflect a careful concern for the broad interests and wellbeing of Humanity, and should be made available to the public in advance of transmission.
7. As the sending of a communication to extraterrestrial intelligence could lead to an exchange of communications separated by many years, consideration should be given to a long-term institutional framework for such communications.
8. No communication to extraterrestrial intelligence should be sent by any State until appropriate international consultations have taken place. States should not cooperate with attempts to communicate with extraterrestrial intelligence that do not conform to the principles of this Declaration.
9. In their deliberations on these questions, States participating in this Declaration and United Nations bodies should draw on the expertise of scientists, scholars, and other persons with relevant knowledge.

The document does not carry the force of law or any other regulatory power. Hence it can be ignored by public or private institutions should they choose to, without legal repercussions.

In 2026, the protocols were updated and endorsed by the IAA SETI Committee and the IAA Board of Trustees. The latest Postdetection Protocols are presented as an IAA Position paper.

== See also ==
- Human presence in space
- Global governance, international policy and/or cooperation for policies which are implemented in parallel and/or interdependently globally
