= First contact (anthropology) =

First meeting of two cultures previously unaware of one another

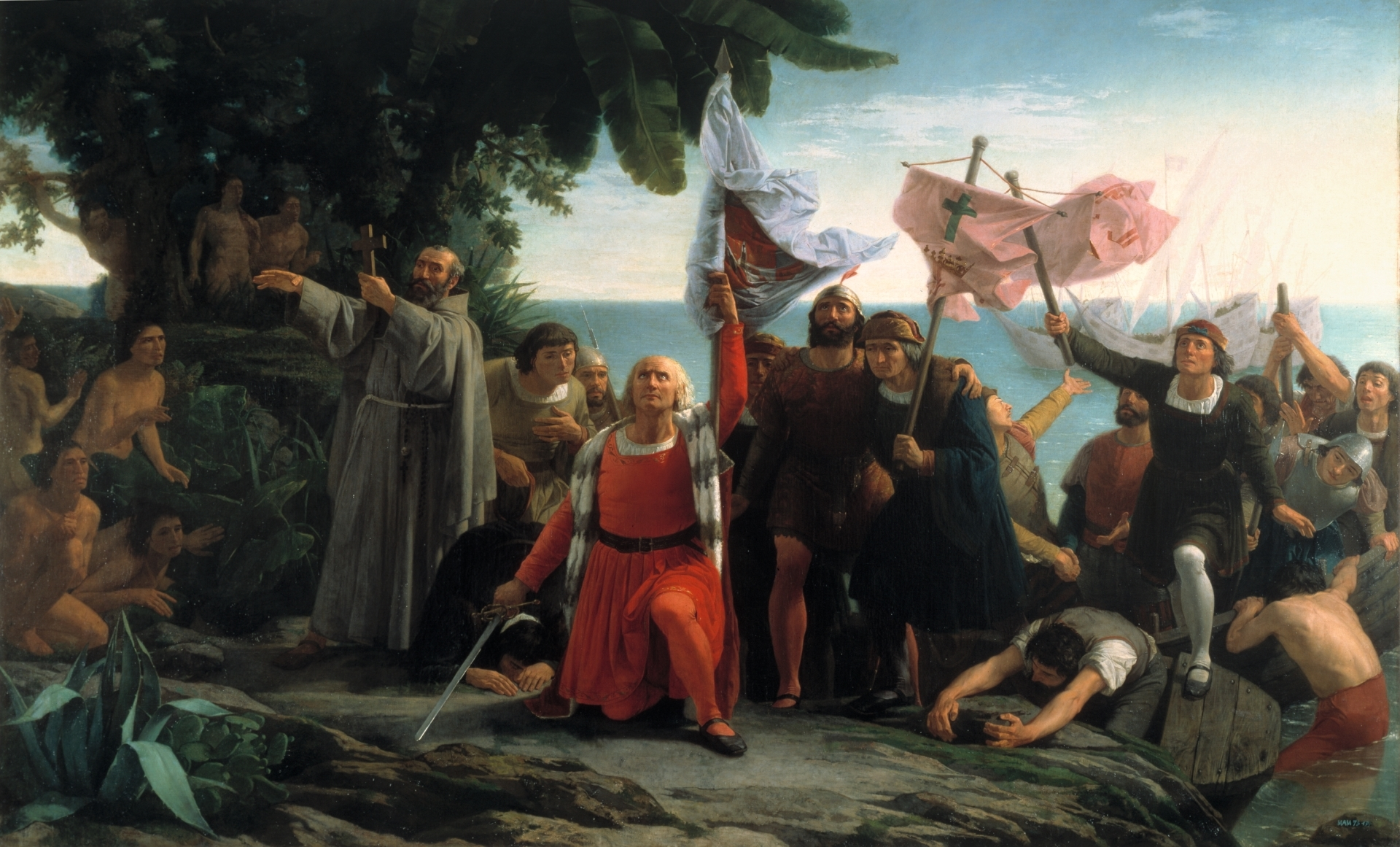
The Landing of Columbus, by Dióscoro Puebla

In anthropology, first contact is the first meeting of two communities previously without contact with one another. Notable examples of first contact are those between the Norse and Native North Americans circa 1000 CE, the Spanish Empire and the Arawak in 1492; and the Aboriginal Australians with Europeans in 1788 when the First Fleet arrived in Sydney.

Such contact is sometimes described as a "discovery", such as the British and United States did by creating the legal theory of the "Doctrine of Discovery". It is generally the more technologically complex society that is able to travel to new geographic regions to make contact with those more isolated, less technologically complex societies. However, some object to the application of such a word to human beings, which is why "first contact" is generally preferred. The use of the term "discovery" tends to occur more in reference to geography than cultures; for an example of a common discovery debate, see Discoverer of the Americas.

The fascination with first contact has gone through many transformations since the Age of Discovery, one of the earliest narratives being about contacting the Ten Lost Tribes and Prester John, and continues today as a trope in science fiction about extraterrestrial first contact, as well as being manifested in contemporary space exploration (for example the Pioneer plaque).

Establishing contact with uncontacted peoples is still attempted, despite the negative effects, history and opposition by indigenous peoples, advocacy groups and specialized institutions like FUNAI.

== Consequences ==
The historical record has repeatedly demonstrated that when one culture is significantly more technologically advanced than the other, this side is usually favored by the disruptive nature of conflict, often with dire consequences for the other society, though the transmission of diseases between cultures also plays a critical role in the process. More isolated peoples who lived across broader territories at lower population densities have generally succumbed to the illnesses brought from the comparatively higher densities of Eurasian peoples. Indigenous populations simply did not have time to develop immunity to the foreign diseases, all introduced at once, to which the more urbanised European populations had had many generations to develop some partial immunity. The relative sizes of the contact populations can influence the process of inter-cultural development, as seen in Viking Greenland or in the Roanoke Colony.

Possible outcomes of contact for the groups involved may include:

- social integration
- colonization
- elimination (genocide)

== History ==
Long before contemporary uncontacted peoples, there were many more cases of communities and states being isolated from each other, sometimes only having poor knowledge of each other and poor contact. One such case is the poor formal contact between Europe and China in the course of the long history of the Silk Road trade and later contact with the Mongol Empire. Frustration with the lack of contact gave rise to the characterization of China as isolationist, and after being identified with Greater India and Prester John, the European powers, such as the Portuguese Prince Henry the Navigator, attempted to reach the isolated Greater India by travelling westward. The European colonial powers thereby mistakenly identified the Americas as the West Indies - a part of Greater India - and named the indigenous peoples of the Americas incorrectly as "Indians". This contacting has been called one-sided "discovery" as is the case with discovery doctrine, and has been reinvented contemporarily by narratives of first contact beyond Earth finding its way into actual space exploration (for example the Pioneer plaque). It has been argued that, for colonialism, this seeking out of first contact proved to be a crucial element to gain control over knowledge and representation of the other, fetishizing and objectifying contact and its place on the frontier drawing a long history of one-sided contact, until today with indigenous peoples and specifically uncontacted peoples.

== Notable examples ==
Numerous important instances of first contact have occurred without detailed contemporary recordings across Eurasia and Africa, including the 330 BCE invasions of Alexander the Great from Persia to India and the establishment of Romano-Chinese relations in the 2nd century CE. However, well-established trade routes from prehistoric times meant that many of the cultures would have been aware of the other before they met.

Date	Indigenous	Expedition / Leader	Exploring group	Location	Description of first contact
~1000	Beothuk	Leif Erikson	Vikings	L'Anse Aux Meadows, Vinland (modern Canada)	Viking settlement was established at L'Anse Aux Meadows in approximately 1000 CE. The vikings referred to the indigenous people as Skræling, who were in actuality likely the proto-Beothuk, with whom they had contact. It is debated whether this contact was peaceful or violent. Archaeological estimates for the Norse population of L'Anse Aux Meadows range from 30 to 120 people.
12 October 1492	Taíno, Galibi and Ciboney etc.	Christopher Columbus's first voyage	Spanish Empire	Guanahani (modern Bahamas); Cuba; Hispaniola	Violent, led to numerous deaths and enslavement of many indigenous inhabitants of the West Indies and their subjugation to extreme violence and brutality.
30 July 1502	Maya (Note: Disputed, as some literature suggests or deems this a first contact with a non-Maya people (the Paya, a people of the Ulua Valley, or some other indigenous people of the area have been suggested). See: Bedini 2000, p. 724; Healy PF, Savage D (March 2021). "The T-shaped "axe" from Northeast Honduras: Observations on chronology and function of a pre Columbian stone tool". Journal of Lithic Studies. 8 (1): 2-3. doi:10.2218/jls.5771. S2CID 245319193.; Ikäheimo J, Salmi AK, Äikäs T, eds. (2015). Sounds Like Theory: XII Nordic Theoretical Archaeology Group Meeting in Oulu 25–28 April 2012. Monographs of the Archaeological Society of Finland. Vol. 2. Helsinki: Archaeological Society of Finland. pp. 160, 167–168. ISBN 978-952-67594-7-0.; Sheptak RN (June 2013). Colonial Masca in motion: tactics of persistence of a Honduran indigenous community (PhD thesis). Leiden, Netherlands: Leiden University. pp. 39, 54–57, 62, 68, 74. hdl:1887/20999.)	Christopher Columbus's fourth voyage	Spanish Empire	Bonacca, Bay Islands (modern Honduras)	Columbus came upon and forced a barter with a local merchant on a Mesoamerican trading canoe, laden with ceramic wares, dyed cotton textiles, flint-edged swords, copper hatchets, and other goods. As the trader is thought to have hailed from a nearby Maya Lowland port, the meeting is often deemed a first contact for the Spanish (with the Maya) and for the Maya (with a people from the Old World) too.
17 June 1579	Coast Miwok	Francis Drake's circumnavigation	English	Drake's Bay, Northern California	Drake and his crew remained at Drake’s Bay for about one month to repair their ship during which time relations with the Miwok remained peaceful. Ceremoniously, Drake claimed the land for England as Nova Albion but after he sailed away from the area, contact was lost for the next two centuries.
21 July 1595	Polynesians	Álvaro de Mendaña de Neira	Spanish Empire	Marquesas Islands, French Polynesia	Initially friendly, but turning violent in the first encounter and leading to 200 local deaths in the first two weeks.
19 December 1642	Ngāti Tūmatakōkiri	Abel Tasman's first voyage	Dutch	Tasman District, New Zealand	Four Dutch killed, one Māori wounded, no other communication.
19 January 1788	Native Hawaiians	James Cook's third voyage	British Empire	Kauai, Hawaii	General friendly trade; one Indigenous Hawaiian killed.
21 January 1788	Cadigal and Bidjigal etc.	First Fleet (Note: Strictly, the first recorded contact between Europeans and Indigenous Australians on the East Coast of Australia was the visit by Captain James Cook in 1770. However, interaction with Indigenous people at that time was short and minimal whereas the later arrival of the First Fleet was the beginning of sustained European settlement on the continent.)	British Empire	Sydney, Australia	Friendly, reserved, one Aboriginal Australian likely beaten.
29 November 1791	Moriori	William R. Broughton	British Empire	Chatham Island, New Zealand	Shows of aggression by Moriori followed quickly by peaceful relations. Then a fight leading to the death of one Moriori.
1930	Papuan people	Mick Leahy	Australian	New Guinea Highlands, Papua New Guinea	Friendly, some Highland people thought they were ancestors and attempted to rub off their white skins.

== See also ==
- Cargo cult – New religious movement
- Contact zone – Concept in ethnography
- Culture war – Conflict between cultural values
- Outside Context Problem – 1996 Book by Iain M. Banks
- Post-detection policy – Code of conduct
- Uncontacted peoples – Peoples living without sustained contact to the world community
- First contact (science fiction) – Science fiction theme about the first meeting between humans and extraterrestrial life
