= Rio scale =

Measure for extraterrestrial intelligence events

The Rio scale was proposed in 2000 as a means of quantifying the significance of a SETI detection. The scale was designed by Iván Almár and Jill Tarter to help tell policy-makers how likely, from 0 to 10, it is that an extraterrestrial radio signal has been produced by an intelligent civilization.

The scale is inspired by the Torino scale, which is used to determine the impact risk associated with near-Earth objects. Just as the Torino scale takes into account how significant an object's impact on the planet would be, the Rio scale takes into account how much a public announcement of the discovery of extraterrestrial intelligence would probably impact society.

The IAA SETI Permanent Study Group officially adopted the Rio scale as a way of bringing perspective to claims of extraterrestrial intelligence (ETI) detection, and as an acknowledgement that even false ETI detections may have disastrous consequences.

The scale was modified in 2011 to include a consideration of whether contact was achieved through an interstellar message or a physical extraterrestrial artifact, including all indications of intelligent extraterrestrial life such as technosignatures. A 2.0 version of the scale was proposed in 2018.

== Calculation ==
In its 2.0 version, the Rio Scale, R, of a given event is calculated as the product of two terms.

$$R = Q\delta$$

The first term, Q, is the significance of the consequences of an event. It is determined considering three factors: the estimated distance to the source of the signal (a value between 0 and 4), the prospects for communicating with the source (a value between 0 and 4) and how likely is that the sender is aware of humanity (a value between -1 and 2). The value of each factor is determined by answering a question and Q is calculated by summing the three values.

The second term, δ, is the probability that the event actually occurred. Its value is determined by first calculating a term, J, based on three factors: the probability that the signal is real, the probability that it is not instrumental, and the probability that it is not natural or human-made. The values for these factors are determined by answering a questionnaire and J is calculated by summing them. δ is then calculated using the formula δ = 10^{(10-J)/2}.

The final R value, going from 0 to 10, is the likelihood that the observed event was produced by an intelligent civilization.

== Rating scale ==
| Rio value | Importance |
|---|---|
| 10 | Extraordinary |
| 9 | Outstanding |
| 8 | Far-reaching |
| 7 | High |
| 6 | Noteworthy |
| 5 | Intermediate |
| 4 | Moderate |
| 3 | Minor |
| 2 | Low |
| 1 | Insignificant |
| 0 | Nil |

== See also ==
- Quiet and loud aliens
- San Marino Scale
