= Iván Almár =

Hungarian astronomer (born 1932)

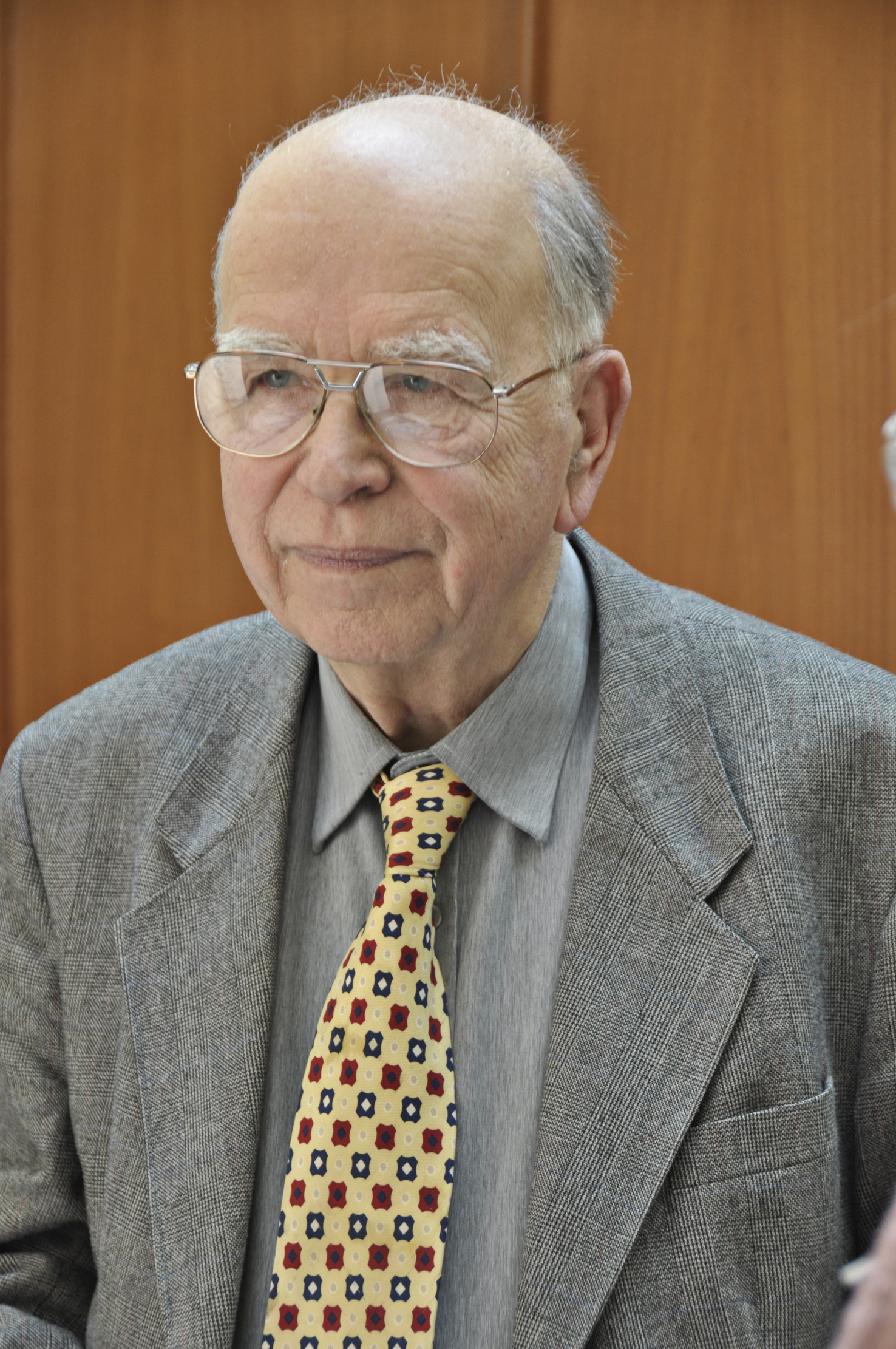
- Almár in March 2011
- Born: April 21, 1932 (age 93); Budapest, Hungary
- Occupation: Astronomer

Iván Almár (born April 21, 1932 in Budapest) is a Hungarian astronomer. He proposed the San Marino Scale as a means of assessing risks related to extraterrestrial communication. Almár also serves on the Advisory Council of METI (Messaging Extraterrestrial Intelligence). Asteroid 191856 Almáriván, discovered by Hungarian astronomer Krisztián Sárneczky at the Piszkéstető Station in 2004, was named in his honor. The official naming citation was published by the Minor Planet Center on 10 December 2011 (M.P.C. 77509). He was inducted into the International Astronautical Federation Hall of Fame on 23 April 2024.
