= Meanings of minor-planet names: 191001–192000 =

As minor planet discoveries are confirmed, they are given a permanent number by the IAU's Minor Planet Center (MPC), and the discoverers can then submit names for them, following the IAU's naming conventions. The list below concerns those minor planets in the specified number-range that have received names, and explains the meanings of those names.

Official naming citations of newly named small Solar System bodies are approved and published in a bulletin by IAU's Working Group for Small Bodies Nomenclature (WGSBN). Before May 2021, citations were published in MPC's Minor Planet Circulars for many decades. Recent citations can also be found on the JPL Small-Body Database (SBDB). Until his death in 2016, German astronomer Lutz D. Schmadel compiled these citations into the Dictionary of Minor Planet Names (DMP) and regularly updated the collection.

Based on Paul Herget's The Names of the Minor Planets, Schmadel also researched the unclear origin of numerous asteroids, most of which had been named prior to World War II. This article incorporates text from this source, which is in the public domain: SBDB New namings may only be added to this list below after official publication as the preannouncement of names is condemned. The WGSBN publishes a comprehensive guideline for the naming rules of non-cometary small Solar System bodies.

== 191001–191100 ==
Named minor planet	Provisional	This minor planet was named for...	Ref · Catalog
There are no named minor planets in this number range

== 191101–191200 ==
back to top

Named minor planet	Provisional	This minor planet was named for...	Ref · Catalog
There are no named minor planets in this number range

== 191201–191300 ==
back to top

Named minor planet	Provisional	This minor planet was named for...	Ref · Catalog
191282 Feustel	2003 FS	Andrew Feustel (born 1965), American/Canadian NASA astronaut and member of the crew who serviced the Hubble Telescope during space shuttle mission STS-125 in 2009	JPL · 191282

== 191301–191400 ==
back to top

Named minor planet	Provisional	This minor planet was named for...	Ref · Catalog
191341 Lánczos	2003 QC_{31}	Kornél Lánczos (1893–1974), a Hungarian physicist and mathematician. JPL	MPC · 191341

== 191401–191500 ==
back to top

Named minor planet	Provisional	This minor planet was named for...	Ref · Catalog
191494 Berndkoch	2003 UE_{5}	Bernd Koch (born 1955), German physicist, amateur astronomer and a discoverer of minor planets	JPL · 191494

== 191501–191600 ==
back to top

Named minor planet	Provisional	This minor planet was named for...	Ref · Catalog
191551 Glücklich	2003 VK_{1}	Vilma Glücklich (1872–1927) was a teacher, one of the leaders of the feminist movement, and the first woman to attend university in Hungary.	IAU · 191551
191582 Kikadolfi	2003 YK_{69}	Federica Dolfi (born 1971), Italian amateur astronomer and collaborator at the Pistoia Mountains Astronomical Observatory	JPL · 191582

== 191601–191700 ==
back to top

Named minor planet	Provisional	This minor planet was named for...	Ref · Catalog
There are no named minor planets in this number range

== 191701–191800 ==
back to top

Named minor planet	Provisional	This minor planet was named for...	Ref · Catalog
191775 Poczobut	2004 TQ_{77}	Marcin Odlanicki Poczobut (Lithuanian: Martynas Pocobutas, 1728–1810) was a Lithuanian-Polish Jesuit, astronomer and mathematician who was Director of the Vilnius Astronomical Observatory from 1764 to 1807	IAU · 191775

== 191801–191900 ==
back to top

Named minor planet	Provisional	This minor planet was named for...	Ref · Catalog
191856 Almáriván	2004 VW_{69}	Iván Almár (born 1932), Hungarian astronomer and space scientist, who proposed the San Marino Scale	JPL · 191856
191857 Illéserzsébet	2004 VA_{70}	Erzsébet Illés (born 1936), Hungarian astronomer and planetary scientist	JPL · 191857

== 191901–192000 ==
back to top

Named minor planet	Provisional	This minor planet was named for...	Ref · Catalog
191910 Elizawilliams	2005 EO_{258}	Elizabeth Langdon Williams (1879–1981) was an American astronomer. In 1903 she was one of the earliest women to graduate from MIT, earning a degree in physics. Her mathematical computations supported the early 20th-century search for Planet X from Lowell Observatory in Flagstaff, Arizona.	IAU · 191910
191911 Nilerodgers	2005 GG_{41}	Nile Gregory Rodgers (b. 1952) is an American musician, guitarist, producer, and multiple Grammy Award winner. Since the 1970s his musical artistry has pioneered new stylistic frontiers, including catalyzing the advent of hip-hop. He has produced music for legendary artists including David Bowie, Diana Ross and Madonna.	IAU · 191911

back to top

Preceded by 190,001–191,000	Meanings of minor-planet names List of minor planets: 191,001–192,000	Succeeded by 192,001–193,000
