= List of minor planets: 191001–192000 =

The following is a partial list of minor planets, running from minor-planet number 191001 through 192000, inclusive. The primary data for this and other partial lists is based on JPL's "Small-Body Orbital Elements" and data available from the Minor Planet Center. Critical list information is also provided by the MPC, unless otherwise specified from Lowell Observatory. A detailed description of the table's columns and additional sources are given on the main page including a complete list of every page in this series, and a statistical break-up on the dynamical classification of minor planets.

Also see the summary list of all named bodies in numerical and alphabetical order, and the corresponding naming citations for the number range of this particular list. New namings may only be added to this list after official publication, as the preannouncement of names is condemned by the Working Group for Small Bodies Nomenclature of the International Astronomical Union.

Near-Earth obj.	MBA (inner)	MBA (outer)	Centaur
Mars-crosser	MBA (middle)	Jupiter trojan	Trans-Neptunian obj.
Unclassified

== 191001–191100 ==
Designation			Discovery			Properties		Ref
Permanent	Provisional	Named after	Date	Site	Discoverer(s)	Category	Diam.	Ref
191001	2001 YP_{53}	—	December 18, 2001	Socorro	LINEAR	·	2.1 km	MPC · JPL
191002	2001 YV_{67}	—	December 18, 2001	Socorro	LINEAR	·	2.8 km	MPC · JPL
191003	2001 YW_{85}	—	December 18, 2001	Socorro	LINEAR	·	2.2 km	MPC · JPL
191004	2001 YQ_{87}	—	December 18, 2001	Socorro	LINEAR	·	3.6 km	MPC · JPL
191005	2001 YB_{95}	—	December 18, 2001	Palomar	NEAT	·	2.7 km	MPC · JPL
191006	2001 YE_{109}	—	December 18, 2001	Socorro	LINEAR	·	2.1 km	MPC · JPL
191007	2001 YF_{111}	—	December 19, 2001	Socorro	LINEAR	·	1.9 km	MPC · JPL
191008	2001 YG_{122}	—	December 17, 2001	Socorro	LINEAR	·	2.4 km	MPC · JPL
191009	2001 YS_{132}	—	December 20, 2001	Socorro	LINEAR	·	2.2 km	MPC · JPL
191010	2002 AO_{10}	—	January 5, 2002	Haleakala	NEAT	(5)	1.9 km	MPC · JPL
191011	2002 AM_{15}	—	January 6, 2002	Socorro	LINEAR	PHO	2.0 km	MPC · JPL
191012	2002 AZ_{29}	—	January 8, 2002	Socorro	LINEAR	·	2.0 km	MPC · JPL
191013	2002 AF_{45}	—	January 9, 2002	Socorro	LINEAR	·	2.0 km	MPC · JPL
191014	2002 AY_{45}	—	January 9, 2002	Socorro	LINEAR	·	1.4 km	MPC · JPL
191015	2002 AQ_{51}	—	January 9, 2002	Socorro	LINEAR	·	1.3 km	MPC · JPL
191016	2002 AX_{63}	—	January 11, 2002	Socorro	LINEAR	·	2.9 km	MPC · JPL
191017	2002 AM_{76}	—	January 8, 2002	Socorro	LINEAR	·	1.7 km	MPC · JPL
191018	2002 AU_{82}	—	January 9, 2002	Socorro	LINEAR	·	2.3 km	MPC · JPL
191019	2002 AG_{90}	—	January 11, 2002	Socorro	LINEAR	·	2.2 km	MPC · JPL
191020	2002 AR_{93}	—	January 8, 2002	Socorro	LINEAR	MAS	890 m	MPC · JPL
191021	2002 AV_{104}	—	January 9, 2002	Socorro	LINEAR	·	1.5 km	MPC · JPL
191022	2002 AL_{110}	—	January 9, 2002	Socorro	LINEAR	·	2.4 km	MPC · JPL
191023	2002 AZ_{111}	—	January 9, 2002	Socorro	LINEAR	MAS	1.3 km	MPC · JPL
191024	2002 AF_{139}	—	January 9, 2002	Socorro	LINEAR	·	2.3 km	MPC · JPL
191025	2002 AC_{149}	—	January 14, 2002	Socorro	LINEAR	·	2.0 km	MPC · JPL
191026	2002 AW_{159}	—	January 13, 2002	Socorro	LINEAR	·	1.6 km	MPC · JPL
191027	2002 AJ_{160}	—	January 13, 2002	Socorro	LINEAR	·	1.9 km	MPC · JPL
191028	2002 AS_{168}	—	January 14, 2002	Socorro	LINEAR	L4 · HEK	20 km	MPC · JPL
191029	2002 BR	—	January 21, 2002	Desert Eagle	W. K. Y. Yeung	·	2.0 km	MPC · JPL
191030	2002 BD_{2}	—	January 21, 2002	Socorro	LINEAR	H	830 m	MPC · JPL
191031	2002 BH_{14}	—	January 19, 2002	Socorro	LINEAR	·	3.0 km	MPC · JPL
191032	2002 BR_{16}	—	January 19, 2002	Socorro	LINEAR	H	960 m	MPC · JPL
191033	2002 BW_{21}	—	January 19, 2002	Socorro	LINEAR	·	2.2 km	MPC · JPL
191034	2002 BV_{26}	—	January 18, 2002	Anderson Mesa	LONEOS	MAR	1.6 km	MPC · JPL
191035	2002 CR_{9}	—	February 6, 2002	Socorro	LINEAR	·	2.8 km	MPC · JPL
191036	2002 CG_{19}	—	February 4, 2002	Palomar	NEAT	·	5.0 km	MPC · JPL
191037	2002 CK_{19}	—	February 4, 2002	Palomar	NEAT	·	2.0 km	MPC · JPL
191038	2002 CD_{21}	—	February 4, 2002	Haleakala	NEAT	EUN	1.8 km	MPC · JPL
191039	2002 CV_{24}	—	February 6, 2002	Haleakala	NEAT	EUN	2.3 km	MPC · JPL
191040	2002 CU_{25}	—	February 10, 2002	Socorro	LINEAR	H	1.1 km	MPC · JPL
191041	2002 CY_{27}	—	February 6, 2002	Socorro	LINEAR	RAF	2.1 km	MPC · JPL
191042	2002 CE_{30}	—	February 6, 2002	Socorro	LINEAR	·	2.8 km	MPC · JPL
191043	2002 CP_{31}	—	February 6, 2002	Socorro	LINEAR	·	3.7 km	MPC · JPL
191044	2002 CQ_{31}	—	February 6, 2002	Socorro	LINEAR	MAR	1.9 km	MPC · JPL
191045	2002 CG_{32}	—	February 6, 2002	Socorro	LINEAR	EUN	1.8 km	MPC · JPL
191046	2002 CN_{39}	—	February 11, 2002	Desert Eagle	W. K. Y. Yeung	·	2.0 km	MPC · JPL
191047	2002 CS_{42}	—	February 7, 2002	Haleakala	NEAT	·	4.4 km	MPC · JPL
191048	2002 CM_{55}	—	February 7, 2002	Socorro	LINEAR	·	3.2 km	MPC · JPL
191049	2002 CE_{56}	—	February 7, 2002	Socorro	LINEAR	·	4.0 km	MPC · JPL
191050	2002 CE_{64}	—	February 6, 2002	Socorro	LINEAR	·	2.9 km	MPC · JPL
191051	2002 CK_{64}	—	February 6, 2002	Socorro	LINEAR	·	4.2 km	MPC · JPL
191052	2002 CC_{70}	—	February 7, 2002	Socorro	LINEAR	·	2.3 km	MPC · JPL
191053	2002 CS_{72}	—	February 7, 2002	Socorro	LINEAR	·	4.5 km	MPC · JPL
191054	2002 CZ_{80}	—	February 7, 2002	Socorro	LINEAR	L4	20 km	MPC · JPL
191055	2002 CC_{81}	—	February 7, 2002	Socorro	LINEAR	·	2.7 km	MPC · JPL
191056	2002 CL_{98}	—	February 7, 2002	Socorro	LINEAR	·	4.3 km	MPC · JPL
191057	2002 CD_{100}	—	February 7, 2002	Socorro	LINEAR	·	2.8 km	MPC · JPL
191058	2002 CO_{105}	—	February 7, 2002	Socorro	LINEAR	(5)	2.2 km	MPC · JPL
191059	2002 CM_{108}	—	February 7, 2002	Socorro	LINEAR	H	870 m	MPC · JPL
191060	2002 CT_{111}	—	February 7, 2002	Socorro	LINEAR	L4	20 km	MPC · JPL
191061	2002 CM_{118}	—	February 7, 2002	Kitt Peak	Spacewatch	·	1.3 km	MPC · JPL
191062	2002 CD_{131}	—	February 7, 2002	Socorro	LINEAR	·	1.9 km	MPC · JPL
191063	2002 CJ_{137}	—	February 8, 2002	Socorro	LINEAR	ADE	4.3 km	MPC · JPL
191064	2002 CL_{138}	—	February 8, 2002	Socorro	LINEAR	HNS	2.4 km	MPC · JPL
191065	2002 CA_{139}	—	February 8, 2002	Socorro	LINEAR	·	2.6 km	MPC · JPL
191066	2002 CO_{143}	—	February 9, 2002	Socorro	LINEAR	·	1.6 km	MPC · JPL
191067	2002 CJ_{149}	—	February 10, 2002	Socorro	LINEAR	·	1.4 km	MPC · JPL
191068	2002 CL_{149}	—	February 10, 2002	Socorro	LINEAR	L4	10 km	MPC · JPL
191069	2002 CA_{151}	—	February 10, 2002	Socorro	LINEAR	·	1.6 km	MPC · JPL
191070	2002 CC_{151}	—	February 10, 2002	Socorro	LINEAR	·	1.4 km	MPC · JPL
191071	2002 CJ_{155}	—	February 6, 2002	Socorro	LINEAR	·	2.6 km	MPC · JPL
191072	2002 CT_{177}	—	February 10, 2002	Socorro	LINEAR	·	1.3 km	MPC · JPL
191073	2002 CZ_{203}	—	February 10, 2002	Socorro	LINEAR	·	1.8 km	MPC · JPL
191074	2002 CP_{204}	—	February 10, 2002	Socorro	LINEAR	·	3.8 km	MPC · JPL
191075	2002 CM_{208}	—	February 10, 2002	Socorro	LINEAR	L4	20 km	MPC · JPL
191076	2002 CE_{209}	—	February 10, 2002	Socorro	LINEAR	·	2.4 km	MPC · JPL
191077	2002 CA_{210}	—	February 10, 2002	Socorro	LINEAR	·	3.1 km	MPC · JPL
191078	2002 CE_{216}	—	February 10, 2002	Socorro	LINEAR	L4	10 km	MPC · JPL
191079	2002 CN_{220}	—	February 10, 2002	Socorro	LINEAR	·	1.9 km	MPC · JPL
191080	2002 CS_{227}	—	February 6, 2002	Palomar	NEAT	·	3.2 km	MPC · JPL
191081	2002 CX_{231}	—	February 6, 2002	Socorro	LINEAR	·	2.0 km	MPC · JPL
191082	2002 CO_{245}	—	February 13, 2002	Kitt Peak	Spacewatch	·	1.5 km	MPC · JPL
191083	2002 CR_{248}	—	February 14, 2002	Haleakala	NEAT	·	2.0 km	MPC · JPL
191084	2002 CE_{249}	—	February 14, 2002	Kitt Peak	Spacewatch	·	2.1 km	MPC · JPL
191085	2002 CX_{273}	—	February 8, 2002	Kitt Peak	Spacewatch	·	2.6 km	MPC · JPL
191086	2002 CB_{280}	—	February 7, 2002	Palomar	NEAT	·	1.8 km	MPC · JPL
191087	2002 CK_{281}	—	February 8, 2002	Kitt Peak	Spacewatch	·	2.4 km	MPC · JPL
191088	2002 CP_{286}	—	February 10, 2002	Socorro	LINEAR	L4 · ERY	10 km	MPC · JPL
191089	2002 CS_{291}	—	February 10, 2002	Socorro	LINEAR	L4	20 km	MPC · JPL
191090	2002 CS_{302}	—	February 12, 2002	Socorro	LINEAR	·	3.3 km	MPC · JPL
191091	2002 CU_{312}	—	February 13, 2002	Palomar	NEAT	·	1.5 km	MPC · JPL
191092	2002 CP_{314}	—	February 11, 2002	Socorro	LINEAR	·	2.8 km	MPC · JPL
191093	2002 EF	—	March 3, 2002	Gnosca	S. Sposetti	·	3.2 km	MPC · JPL
191094	2002 EA_{3}	—	March 9, 2002	Socorro	LINEAR	APO · critical	330 m	MPC · JPL
191095	2002 ER_{5}	—	March 9, 2002	Socorro	LINEAR	H	890 m	MPC · JPL
191096	2002 EO_{6}	—	March 6, 2002	Siding Spring	R. H. McNaught	·	2.1 km	MPC · JPL
191097	2002 EJ_{10}	—	March 14, 2002	Palomar	NEAT	HNS	2.4 km	MPC · JPL
191098	2002 EK_{11}	—	March 13, 2002	Palomar	NEAT	H	1.1 km	MPC · JPL
191099	2002 EQ_{11}	—	March 14, 2002	Socorro	LINEAR	H	1.2 km	MPC · JPL
191100	2002 EH_{14}	—	March 5, 2002	Haleakala	NEAT	H	710 m	MPC · JPL

== 191101–191200 ==
back to top

Designation			Discovery			Properties		Ref
Permanent	Provisional	Named after	Date	Site	Discoverer(s)	Category	Diam.	Ref
191101	2002 EO_{14}	—	March 6, 2002	Palomar	NEAT	·	2.7 km	MPC · JPL
191102	2002 EW_{14}	—	March 5, 2002	Kitt Peak	Spacewatch	L4	10 km	MPC · JPL
191103	2002 EF_{42}	—	March 12, 2002	Socorro	LINEAR	L4	10 km	MPC · JPL
191104	2002 ET_{44}	—	March 10, 2002	Haleakala	NEAT	L4	10 km	MPC · JPL
191105	2002 EM_{48}	—	March 12, 2002	Palomar	NEAT	·	2.3 km	MPC · JPL
191106	2002 ED_{56}	—	March 13, 2002	Socorro	LINEAR	·	3.7 km	MPC · JPL
191107	2002 ER_{57}	—	March 13, 2002	Socorro	LINEAR	L4	10 km	MPC · JPL
191108	2002 EX_{58}	—	March 13, 2002	Socorro	LINEAR	L4	10 km	MPC · JPL
191109	2002 EW_{62}	—	March 13, 2002	Socorro	LINEAR	·	2.5 km	MPC · JPL
191110	2002 EG_{67}	—	March 13, 2002	Socorro	LINEAR	(5)	2.1 km	MPC · JPL
191111	2002 EU_{71}	—	March 13, 2002	Socorro	LINEAR	PAD	3.5 km	MPC · JPL
191112	2002 EE_{72}	—	March 13, 2002	Socorro	LINEAR	·	3.6 km	MPC · JPL
191113	2002 EY_{73}	—	March 13, 2002	Socorro	LINEAR	BRA	2.3 km	MPC · JPL
191114	2002 EB_{81}	—	March 13, 2002	Palomar	NEAT	L4	18 km	MPC · JPL
191115	2002 ES_{83}	—	March 9, 2002	Socorro	LINEAR	L4	20 km	MPC · JPL
191116	2002 ES_{84}	—	March 9, 2002	Socorro	LINEAR	L4 · (8060)	13 km	MPC · JPL
191117	2002 EG_{90}	—	March 12, 2002	Socorro	LINEAR	·	3.3 km	MPC · JPL
191118	2002 EE_{93}	—	March 14, 2002	Socorro	LINEAR	THM	3.6 km	MPC · JPL
191119	2002 EY_{93}	—	March 14, 2002	Socorro	LINEAR	·	3.0 km	MPC · JPL
191120	2002 EZ_{130}	—	March 12, 2002	Palomar	NEAT	·	2.7 km	MPC · JPL
191121	2002 EF_{131}	—	March 13, 2002	Socorro	LINEAR	NEM	3.5 km	MPC · JPL
191122	2002 EU_{131}	—	March 13, 2002	Kitt Peak	Spacewatch	·	2.5 km	MPC · JPL
191123	2002 EB_{135}	—	March 13, 2002	Palomar	NEAT	·	2.0 km	MPC · JPL
191124	2002 EL_{137}	—	March 12, 2002	Palomar	NEAT	·	2.8 km	MPC · JPL
191125	2002 EG_{138}	—	March 12, 2002	Palomar	NEAT	·	2.1 km	MPC · JPL
191126	2002 EU_{138}	—	March 12, 2002	Palomar	NEAT	PAD	2.9 km	MPC · JPL
191127	2002 FC_{1}	—	March 18, 2002	Desert Eagle	W. K. Y. Yeung	·	4.0 km	MPC · JPL
191128	2002 FM_{2}	—	March 19, 2002	Desert Eagle	W. K. Y. Yeung	·	3.1 km	MPC · JPL
191129	2002 FP_{10}	—	March 17, 2002	Socorro	LINEAR	·	2.9 km	MPC · JPL
191130	2002 FE_{35}	—	March 20, 2002	Socorro	LINEAR	·	4.1 km	MPC · JPL
191131	2002 GH_{5}	—	April 10, 2002	Socorro	LINEAR	H	920 m	MPC · JPL
191132	2002 GK_{23}	—	April 15, 2002	Palomar	NEAT	MIS	3.8 km	MPC · JPL
191133	2002 GF_{33}	—	April 1, 2002	Anderson Mesa	LONEOS	·	2.9 km	MPC · JPL
191134	2002 GH_{33}	—	April 1, 2002	Anderson Mesa	LONEOS	EUN	1.7 km	MPC · JPL
191135	2002 GG_{43}	—	April 4, 2002	Palomar	NEAT	·	2.1 km	MPC · JPL
191136	2002 GC_{45}	—	April 4, 2002	Palomar	NEAT	·	2.9 km	MPC · JPL
191137	2002 GT_{56}	—	April 5, 2002	Palomar	NEAT	·	4.8 km	MPC · JPL
191138	2002 GX_{70}	—	April 8, 2002	Bergisch Gladbach	W. Bickel	·	3.6 km	MPC · JPL
191139	2002 GG_{76}	—	April 9, 2002	Kitt Peak	Spacewatch	(5)	2.5 km	MPC · JPL
191140	2002 GM_{86}	—	April 10, 2002	Socorro	LINEAR	·	3.1 km	MPC · JPL
191141	2002 GP_{87}	—	April 10, 2002	Socorro	LINEAR	·	3.9 km	MPC · JPL
191142	2002 GM_{102}	—	April 10, 2002	Socorro	LINEAR	·	3.7 km	MPC · JPL
191143	2002 GS_{102}	—	April 10, 2002	Socorro	LINEAR	WIT	2.0 km	MPC · JPL
191144	2002 GH_{113}	—	April 11, 2002	Anderson Mesa	LONEOS	·	3.4 km	MPC · JPL
191145	2002 GH_{119}	—	April 12, 2002	Palomar	NEAT	ADE ·	2.0 km	MPC · JPL
191146	2002 GT_{128}	—	April 12, 2002	Socorro	LINEAR	·	3.4 km	MPC · JPL
191147	2002 GS_{130}	—	April 12, 2002	Socorro	LINEAR	·	2.1 km	MPC · JPL
191148	2002 GW_{140}	—	April 13, 2002	Palomar	NEAT	·	5.1 km	MPC · JPL
191149	2002 GO_{148}	—	April 14, 2002	Socorro	LINEAR	HOF	4.3 km	MPC · JPL
191150	2002 GG_{149}	—	April 14, 2002	Palomar	NEAT	·	2.7 km	MPC · JPL
191151	2002 GA_{173}	—	April 10, 2002	Socorro	LINEAR	·	3.2 km	MPC · JPL
191152	2002 HP_{2}	—	April 16, 2002	Socorro	LINEAR	·	2.6 km	MPC · JPL
191153	2002 HS_{4}	—	April 17, 2002	Socorro	LINEAR	H	980 m	MPC · JPL
191154	2002 HA_{11}	—	April 18, 2002	Haleakala	NEAT	·	3.9 km	MPC · JPL
191155	2002 JO_{36}	—	May 4, 2002	Anderson Mesa	LONEOS	·	4.7 km	MPC · JPL
191156	2002 JG_{38}	—	May 9, 2002	Palomar	NEAT	WAT	3.4 km	MPC · JPL
191157	2002 JH_{38}	—	May 9, 2002	Palomar	NEAT	·	1.8 km	MPC · JPL
191158	2002 JX_{43}	—	May 9, 2002	Socorro	LINEAR	H	1.3 km	MPC · JPL
191159	2002 JG_{71}	—	May 8, 2002	Socorro	LINEAR	·	4.0 km	MPC · JPL
191160	2002 JV_{73}	—	May 8, 2002	Socorro	LINEAR	·	5.7 km	MPC · JPL
191161	2002 JY_{86}	—	May 11, 2002	Socorro	LINEAR	·	2.3 km	MPC · JPL
191162	2002 JN_{122}	—	May 6, 2002	Socorro	LINEAR	·	10 km	MPC · JPL
191163	2002 JN_{125}	—	May 7, 2002	Palomar	NEAT	·	3.0 km	MPC · JPL
191164	2002 JD_{148}	—	May 8, 2002	Anderson Mesa	LONEOS	·	2.2 km	MPC · JPL
191165	2002 JR_{148}	—	May 9, 2002	Palomar	NEAT	·	2.7 km	MPC · JPL
191166	2002 KQ_{2}	—	May 18, 2002	Palomar	NEAT	·	4.1 km	MPC · JPL
191167	2002 LK_{6}	—	June 1, 2002	Socorro	LINEAR	·	5.1 km	MPC · JPL
191168	2002 LX_{29}	—	June 9, 2002	Haleakala	NEAT	·	5.1 km	MPC · JPL
191169	2002 LJ_{36}	—	June 9, 2002	Socorro	LINEAR	·	7.8 km	MPC · JPL
191170	2002 MF_{3}	—	June 19, 2002	Socorro	LINEAR	·	7.3 km	MPC · JPL
191171	2002 MF_{5}	—	June 16, 2002	Palomar	NEAT	·	4.8 km	MPC · JPL
191172	2002 MH_{5}	—	June 20, 2002	Palomar	NEAT	·	5.1 km	MPC · JPL
191173	2002 ND_{11}	—	July 4, 2002	Palomar	NEAT	·	5.3 km	MPC · JPL
191174	2002 NF_{12}	—	July 4, 2002	Palomar	NEAT	·	5.0 km	MPC · JPL
191175	2002 NT_{21}	—	July 9, 2002	Socorro	LINEAR	URS	6.4 km	MPC · JPL
191176	2002 NA_{32}	—	July 13, 2002	Socorro	LINEAR	·	11 km	MPC · JPL
191177	2002 NX_{35}	—	July 9, 2002	Socorro	LINEAR	·	3.6 km	MPC · JPL
191178	2002 NS_{36}	—	July 9, 2002	Socorro	LINEAR	·	6.0 km	MPC · JPL
191179	2002 NR_{43}	—	July 15, 2002	Palomar	NEAT	·	5.8 km	MPC · JPL
191180	2002 NA_{47}	—	July 12, 2002	Palomar	NEAT	·	5.1 km	MPC · JPL
191181	2002 NZ_{52}	—	July 14, 2002	Palomar	NEAT	·	3.0 km	MPC · JPL
191182	2002 NR_{53}	—	July 14, 2002	Palomar	NEAT	·	5.5 km	MPC · JPL
191183	2002 NZ_{55}	—	July 12, 2002	Palomar	NEAT	·	5.7 km	MPC · JPL
191184	2002 NC_{56}	—	July 15, 2002	Palomar	NEAT	TIR	4.9 km	MPC · JPL
191185	2002 OK_{10}	—	July 22, 2002	Palomar	NEAT	·	5.2 km	MPC · JPL
191186	2002 OW_{10}	—	July 22, 2002	Palomar	NEAT	·	5.4 km	MPC · JPL
191187	2002 OH_{11}	—	July 16, 2002	Haleakala	NEAT	·	5.8 km	MPC · JPL
191188	2002 OD_{16}	—	July 18, 2002	Socorro	LINEAR	EOS	3.6 km	MPC · JPL
191189	2002 OP_{16}	—	July 18, 2002	Socorro	LINEAR	·	5.0 km	MPC · JPL
191190	2002 OA_{20}	—	July 23, 2002	Palomar	NEAT	·	8.8 km	MPC · JPL
191191	2002 OY_{20}	—	July 22, 2002	Palomar	NEAT	CYB	4.4 km	MPC · JPL
191192	2002 PA_{4}	—	August 4, 2002	Palomar	NEAT	EOS	3.5 km	MPC · JPL
191193	2002 PV_{4}	—	August 4, 2002	Palomar	NEAT	·	3.7 km	MPC · JPL
191194	2002 PV_{5}	—	August 4, 2002	Palomar	NEAT	TIR	3.1 km	MPC · JPL
191195	2002 PN_{15}	—	August 6, 2002	Palomar	NEAT	HYG	4.5 km	MPC · JPL
191196	2002 PW_{15}	—	August 6, 2002	Palomar	NEAT	HYG	4.5 km	MPC · JPL
191197	2002 PS_{37}	—	August 6, 2002	Palomar	NEAT	HYG	4.2 km	MPC · JPL
191198	2002 PC_{47}	—	August 10, 2002	Socorro	LINEAR	LIX	7.1 km	MPC · JPL
191199	2002 PO_{47}	—	August 10, 2002	Socorro	LINEAR	·	7.5 km	MPC · JPL
191200	2002 PA_{70}	—	August 11, 2002	Socorro	LINEAR	·	6.6 km	MPC · JPL

== 191201–191300 ==
back to top

Designation			Discovery			Properties		Ref
Permanent	Provisional	Named after	Date	Site	Discoverer(s)	Category	Diam.	Ref
191201	2002 PN_{71}	—	August 12, 2002	Socorro	LINEAR	·	7.0 km	MPC · JPL
191202	2002 PJ_{82}	—	August 9, 2002	Socorro	LINEAR	·	7.3 km	MPC · JPL
191203	2002 PT_{94}	—	August 12, 2002	Haleakala	NEAT	·	6.2 km	MPC · JPL
191204	2002 PN_{97}	—	August 14, 2002	Socorro	LINEAR	·	8.9 km	MPC · JPL
191205	2002 PS_{105}	—	August 12, 2002	Socorro	LINEAR	·	4.2 km	MPC · JPL
191206	2002 PP_{109}	—	August 13, 2002	Anderson Mesa	LONEOS	·	6.8 km	MPC · JPL
191207	2002 PH_{169}	—	August 8, 2002	Palomar	NEAT	KOR	2.2 km	MPC · JPL
191208	2002 QU_{28}	—	August 29, 2002	Palomar	NEAT	·	6.9 km	MPC · JPL
191209	2002 QE_{32}	—	August 29, 2002	Palomar	NEAT	·	6.4 km	MPC · JPL
191210	2002 QR_{41}	—	August 29, 2002	Palomar	NEAT	·	4.7 km	MPC · JPL
191211	2002 QC_{58}	—	August 17, 2002	Palomar	Lowe, A.	·	4.2 km	MPC · JPL
191212	2002 QV_{116}	—	August 29, 2002	Palomar	NEAT	·	3.5 km	MPC · JPL
191213	2002 RA_{1}	—	September 2, 2002	Bagnall Beach	Crawford, G.	·	5.6 km	MPC · JPL
191214	2002 RO_{30}	—	September 4, 2002	Anderson Mesa	LONEOS	VER	6.9 km	MPC · JPL
191215	2002 RA_{39}	—	September 5, 2002	Socorro	LINEAR	·	6.4 km	MPC · JPL
191216	2002 RJ_{40}	—	September 5, 2002	Socorro	LINEAR	·	5.1 km	MPC · JPL
191217	2002 RX_{43}	—	September 5, 2002	Socorro	LINEAR	THM	4.2 km	MPC · JPL
191218	2002 RY_{50}	—	September 5, 2002	Socorro	LINEAR	·	5.5 km	MPC · JPL
191219	2002 RC_{71}	—	September 4, 2002	Palomar	NEAT	·	5.1 km	MPC · JPL
191220	2002 RU_{74}	—	September 5, 2002	Socorro	LINEAR	·	3.0 km	MPC · JPL
191221	2002 RL_{85}	—	September 5, 2002	Socorro	LINEAR	·	7.2 km	MPC · JPL
191222	2002 RY_{88}	—	September 5, 2002	Socorro	LINEAR	CYB	3.8 km	MPC · JPL
191223	2002 RK_{124}	—	September 9, 2002	Palomar	NEAT	·	3.2 km	MPC · JPL
191224	2002 RK_{146}	—	September 11, 2002	Palomar	NEAT	·	6.1 km	MPC · JPL
191225	2002 RN_{150}	—	September 11, 2002	Haleakala	NEAT	CYB	9.2 km	MPC · JPL
191226	2002 RC_{170}	—	September 13, 2002	Palomar	NEAT	·	6.5 km	MPC · JPL
191227	2002 RA_{239}	—	September 1, 2002	Haleakala	R. Matson	·	6.1 km	MPC · JPL
191228	2002 RN_{242}	—	September 3, 2002	Needville	J. Dellinger, Dillon, W. G.	·	4.2 km	MPC · JPL
191229	2002 RQ_{246}	—	September 15, 2002	Palomar	NEAT	·	4.9 km	MPC · JPL
191230	2002 SG_{1}	—	September 26, 2002	Haleakala	NEAT	·	6.5 km	MPC · JPL
191231	2002 SR_{6}	—	September 27, 2002	Palomar	NEAT	·	5.8 km	MPC · JPL
191232	2002 SL_{18}	—	September 26, 2002	Socorro	LINEAR	·	5.4 km	MPC · JPL
191233	2002 SX_{45}	—	September 29, 2002	Kitt Peak	Spacewatch	·	3.8 km	MPC · JPL
191234	2002 TX_{17}	—	October 2, 2002	Socorro	LINEAR	·	1.5 km	MPC · JPL
191235	2002 TB_{122}	—	October 3, 2002	Campo Imperatore	CINEOS	·	5.9 km	MPC · JPL
191236	2002 TT_{139}	—	October 4, 2002	Anderson Mesa	LONEOS	·	1.3 km	MPC · JPL
191237	2002 TA_{175}	—	October 4, 2002	Socorro	LINEAR	CYB	6.8 km	MPC · JPL
191238	2002 UP_{27}	—	October 31, 2002	Palomar	NEAT	EOS	3.7 km	MPC · JPL
191239	2002 VW_{13}	—	November 4, 2002	Kitt Peak	Spacewatch	·	1.2 km	MPC · JPL
191240	2002 VX_{16}	—	November 5, 2002	Socorro	LINEAR	·	1.0 km	MPC · JPL
191241	2002 VN_{103}	—	November 12, 2002	Socorro	LINEAR	·	890 m	MPC · JPL
191242	2002 XA_{35}	—	December 6, 2002	Socorro	LINEAR	H · slow	1.1 km	MPC · JPL
191243	2002 XJ_{60}	—	December 10, 2002	Socorro	LINEAR	slow	1.1 km	MPC · JPL
191244	2002 YC_{4}	—	December 27, 2002	Anderson Mesa	LONEOS	·	1.5 km	MPC · JPL
191245	2002 YL_{9}	—	December 31, 2002	Socorro	LINEAR	·	1.2 km	MPC · JPL
191246	2002 YV_{15}	—	December 31, 2002	Socorro	LINEAR	·	1.3 km	MPC · JPL
191247	2002 YM_{29}	—	December 31, 2002	Socorro	LINEAR	·	1.3 km	MPC · JPL
191248	2002 YO_{29}	—	December 31, 2002	Socorro	LINEAR	·	1.5 km	MPC · JPL
191249	2003 AS_{38}	—	January 7, 2003	Socorro	LINEAR	·	1.1 km	MPC · JPL
191250	2003 AL_{69}	—	January 7, 2003	Socorro	LINEAR	·	1.1 km	MPC · JPL
191251	2003 AV_{90}	—	January 5, 2003	Anderson Mesa	LONEOS	·	1.2 km	MPC · JPL
191252	2003 BS_{2}	—	January 26, 2003	Haleakala	NEAT	·	1.6 km	MPC · JPL
191253	2003 BE_{9}	—	January 26, 2003	Anderson Mesa	LONEOS	·	1.2 km	MPC · JPL
191254	2003 BO_{9}	—	January 26, 2003	Palomar	NEAT	·	1.0 km	MPC · JPL
191255	2003 BP_{18}	—	January 27, 2003	Socorro	LINEAR	·	1.1 km	MPC · JPL
191256	2003 BW_{27}	—	January 26, 2003	Palomar	NEAT	·	990 m	MPC · JPL
191257	2003 BE_{33}	—	January 27, 2003	Haleakala	NEAT	·	1.1 km	MPC · JPL
191258	2003 BV_{33}	—	January 28, 2003	Socorro	LINEAR	·	1.3 km	MPC · JPL
191259	2003 BL_{37}	—	January 28, 2003	Kitt Peak	Spacewatch	·	1.3 km	MPC · JPL
191260	2003 BM_{49}	—	January 27, 2003	Anderson Mesa	LONEOS	·	2.3 km	MPC · JPL
191261	2003 BK_{53}	—	January 27, 2003	Anderson Mesa	LONEOS	NYS	1.8 km	MPC · JPL
191262	2003 BW_{54}	—	January 27, 2003	Palomar	NEAT	PHO	1.7 km	MPC · JPL
191263	2003 BK_{60}	—	January 27, 2003	Haleakala	NEAT	·	1.2 km	MPC · JPL
191264	2003 BA_{61}	—	January 27, 2003	Palomar	NEAT	NYS	1.9 km	MPC · JPL
191265	2003 BU_{77}	—	January 30, 2003	Socorro	LINEAR	·	1.1 km	MPC · JPL
191266	2003 BG_{82}	—	January 30, 2003	Haleakala	NEAT	MAS	1.1 km	MPC · JPL
191267	2003 CO_{3}	—	February 3, 2003	Kitt Peak	Spacewatch	·	2.3 km	MPC · JPL
191268	2003 CM_{24}	—	February 4, 2003	La Silla	Barbieri, C.	·	990 m	MPC · JPL
191269	2003 DB_{2}	—	February 21, 2003	Palomar	NEAT	V	940 m	MPC · JPL
191270	2003 DN_{13}	—	February 26, 2003	Haleakala	NEAT	·	2.3 km	MPC · JPL
191271	2003 ER_{5}	—	March 5, 2003	Socorro	LINEAR	·	1.2 km	MPC · JPL
191272	2003 EM_{6}	—	March 6, 2003	Anderson Mesa	LONEOS	·	2.5 km	MPC · JPL
191273	2003 EA_{13}	—	March 6, 2003	Palomar	NEAT	MAS	930 m	MPC · JPL
191274	2003 EJ_{13}	—	March 6, 2003	Palomar	NEAT	·	1.3 km	MPC · JPL
191275	2003 ES_{18}	—	March 6, 2003	Anderson Mesa	LONEOS	MAS	1.0 km	MPC · JPL
191276	2003 EZ_{26}	—	March 6, 2003	Anderson Mesa	LONEOS	NYS	1.5 km	MPC · JPL
191277	2003 EN_{29}	—	March 6, 2003	Socorro	LINEAR	·	2.0 km	MPC · JPL
191278	2003 ED_{38}	—	March 8, 2003	Anderson Mesa	LONEOS	·	2.6 km	MPC · JPL
191279	2003 EV_{51}	—	March 11, 2003	Palomar	NEAT	·	3.9 km	MPC · JPL
191280	2003 EZ_{56}	—	March 9, 2003	Palomar	NEAT	·	2.4 km	MPC · JPL
191281	2003 EN_{62}	—	March 9, 2003	Socorro	LINEAR	·	1.9 km	MPC · JPL
191282 Feustel	2003 FS	Feustel	March 22, 2003	Kleť	KLENOT	·	2.0 km	MPC · JPL
191283	2003 FX_{12}	—	March 23, 2003	Kitt Peak	Spacewatch	(5)	1.9 km	MPC · JPL
191284	2003 FA_{36}	—	March 23, 2003	Kitt Peak	Spacewatch	(6769)	1.8 km	MPC · JPL
191285	2003 FU_{57}	—	March 26, 2003	Kitt Peak	Spacewatch	·	2.5 km	MPC · JPL
191286	2003 FY_{57}	—	March 26, 2003	Kitt Peak	Spacewatch	V	990 m	MPC · JPL
191287	2003 FD_{75}	—	March 26, 2003	Haleakala	NEAT	·	2.7 km	MPC · JPL
191288	2003 FZ_{77}	—	March 27, 2003	Palomar	NEAT	·	3.1 km	MPC · JPL
191289	2003 FR_{94}	—	March 29, 2003	Anderson Mesa	LONEOS	·	3.3 km	MPC · JPL
191290	2003 FR_{102}	—	March 31, 2003	Kitt Peak	Spacewatch	·	2.0 km	MPC · JPL
191291	2003 FH_{103}	—	March 24, 2003	Kitt Peak	Spacewatch	L4	10 km	MPC · JPL
191292	2003 FF_{107}	—	March 30, 2003	Socorro	LINEAR	·	2.0 km	MPC · JPL
191293	2003 FK_{107}	—	March 30, 2003	Socorro	LINEAR	·	3.9 km	MPC · JPL
191294	2003 FM_{108}	—	March 31, 2003	Anderson Mesa	LONEOS	(5)	1.8 km	MPC · JPL
191295	2003 FX_{112}	—	March 30, 2003	Kitt Peak	Spacewatch	PHO	1.9 km	MPC · JPL
191296	2003 FQ_{128}	—	March 29, 2003	Anderson Mesa	LONEOS	·	1.5 km	MPC · JPL
191297	2003 GP_{2}	—	April 1, 2003	Palomar	NEAT	·	1.3 km	MPC · JPL
191298	2003 GG_{8}	—	April 3, 2003	Anderson Mesa	LONEOS	·	1.4 km	MPC · JPL
191299	2003 GH_{9}	—	April 2, 2003	Socorro	LINEAR	·	1.6 km	MPC · JPL
191300	2003 GS_{9}	—	April 2, 2003	Socorro	LINEAR	·	1.8 km	MPC · JPL

== 191301–191400 ==
back to top

Designation			Discovery			Properties		Ref
Permanent	Provisional	Named after	Date	Site	Discoverer(s)	Category	Diam.	Ref
191301	2003 GP_{12}	—	April 1, 2003	Socorro	LINEAR	·	2.4 km	MPC · JPL
191302	2003 GD_{32}	—	April 8, 2003	Socorro	LINEAR	(2076)	1.7 km	MPC · JPL
191303	2003 GU_{35}	—	April 5, 2003	Anderson Mesa	LONEOS	L4	20 km	MPC · JPL
191304	2003 GD_{44}	—	April 9, 2003	Socorro	LINEAR	EUN	2.2 km	MPC · JPL
191305	2003 HQ_{20}	—	April 24, 2003	Anderson Mesa	LONEOS	·	2.1 km	MPC · JPL
191306	2003 HV_{20}	—	April 24, 2003	Anderson Mesa	LONEOS	·	2.2 km	MPC · JPL
191307	2003 HV_{21}	—	April 27, 2003	Anderson Mesa	LONEOS	·	2.6 km	MPC · JPL
191308	2003 HX_{29}	—	April 28, 2003	Anderson Mesa	LONEOS	·	2.0 km	MPC · JPL
191309	2003 HQ_{30}	—	April 28, 2003	Haleakala	NEAT	·	2.9 km	MPC · JPL
191310	2003 HM_{32}	—	April 28, 2003	Anderson Mesa	LONEOS	·	2.6 km	MPC · JPL
191311	2003 HV_{37}	—	April 28, 2003	Anderson Mesa	LONEOS	(5)	2.1 km	MPC · JPL
191312	2003 HX_{38}	—	April 29, 2003	Haleakala	NEAT	·	2.8 km	MPC · JPL
191313	2003 HJ_{41}	—	April 29, 2003	Haleakala	NEAT	EUN	1.8 km	MPC · JPL
191314	2003 HC_{44}	—	April 27, 2003	Anderson Mesa	LONEOS	·	1.9 km	MPC · JPL
191315	2003 HT_{46}	—	April 28, 2003	Socorro	LINEAR	·	5.1 km	MPC · JPL
191316	2003 HZ_{47}	—	April 30, 2003	Socorro	LINEAR	EUN	3.3 km	MPC · JPL
191317	2003 HK_{55}	—	April 25, 2003	Campo Imperatore	CINEOS	·	2.1 km	MPC · JPL
191318	2003 HT_{57}	—	April 25, 2003	Apache Point	SDSS	·	3.0 km	MPC · JPL
191319	2003 JW_{7}	—	May 2, 2003	Socorro	LINEAR	·	3.7 km	MPC · JPL
191320	2003 JZ_{12}	—	May 4, 2003	Bergisch Gladbach	W. Bickel	·	4.4 km	MPC · JPL
191321	2003 JF_{18}	—	May 1, 2003	Kitt Peak	Spacewatch	·	2.6 km	MPC · JPL
191322	2003 KJ	—	May 20, 2003	Anderson Mesa	LONEOS	·	3.1 km	MPC · JPL
191323	2003 KN	—	May 22, 2003	Wrightwood	J. W. Young	(7744)	2.0 km	MPC · JPL
191324	2003 KA_{4}	—	May 23, 2003	Reedy Creek	J. Broughton	·	3.2 km	MPC · JPL
191325	2003 LQ_{2}	—	June 3, 2003	Socorro	LINEAR	·	4.0 km	MPC · JPL
191326	2003 MV_{5}	—	June 26, 2003	Socorro	LINEAR	·	4.1 km	MPC · JPL
191327	2003 MO_{12}	—	June 29, 2003	Socorro	LINEAR	·	5.6 km	MPC · JPL
191328	2003 OT_{6}	—	July 21, 2003	Haleakala	NEAT	JUN	1.9 km	MPC · JPL
191329	2003 OB_{18}	—	July 24, 2003	Campo Imperatore	CINEOS	·	3.0 km	MPC · JPL
191330	2003 OX_{28}	—	July 24, 2003	Palomar	NEAT	KOR	2.4 km	MPC · JPL
191331	2003 OZ_{28}	—	July 24, 2003	Palomar	NEAT	KOR	2.1 km	MPC · JPL
191332	2003 PK_{7}	—	August 1, 2003	Haleakala	NEAT	·	4.3 km	MPC · JPL
191333	2003 QR_{1}	—	August 19, 2003	Campo Imperatore	CINEOS	·	4.0 km	MPC · JPL
191334	2003 QB_{2}	—	August 19, 2003	Campo Imperatore	CINEOS	KOR	2.5 km	MPC · JPL
191335	2003 QC_{5}	—	August 20, 2003	Campo Imperatore	CINEOS	·	3.4 km	MPC · JPL
191336	2003 QS_{7}	—	August 21, 2003	Palomar	NEAT	·	2.9 km	MPC · JPL
191337	2003 QN_{11}	—	August 21, 2003	Haleakala	NEAT	BRA	2.8 km	MPC · JPL
191338	2003 QD_{13}	—	August 22, 2003	Haleakala	NEAT	·	3.3 km	MPC · JPL
191339	2003 QD_{19}	—	August 22, 2003	Palomar	NEAT	·	4.0 km	MPC · JPL
191340	2003 QT_{22}	—	August 20, 2003	Palomar	NEAT	EOS	3.8 km	MPC · JPL
191341 Lánczos	2003 QC_{31}	Lánczos	August 24, 2003	Piszkéstető	K. Sárneczky, B. Sipőcz	·	2.2 km	MPC · JPL
191342	2003 QK_{32}	—	August 21, 2003	Palomar	NEAT	·	3.8 km	MPC · JPL
191343	2003 QF_{33}	—	August 22, 2003	Socorro	LINEAR	GEF	2.3 km	MPC · JPL
191344	2003 QK_{33}	—	August 22, 2003	Palomar	NEAT	·	4.9 km	MPC · JPL
191345	2003 QN_{33}	—	August 22, 2003	Palomar	NEAT	EOS	3.3 km	MPC · JPL
191346	2003 QH_{39}	—	August 22, 2003	Palomar	NEAT	KOR	2.6 km	MPC · JPL
191347	2003 QZ_{41}	—	August 22, 2003	Socorro	LINEAR	·	5.7 km	MPC · JPL
191348	2003 QL_{42}	—	August 22, 2003	Socorro	LINEAR	·	3.8 km	MPC · JPL
191349	2003 QF_{46}	—	August 23, 2003	Palomar	NEAT	·	2.6 km	MPC · JPL
191350	2003 QF_{48}	—	August 20, 2003	Palomar	NEAT	·	3.3 km	MPC · JPL
191351	2003 QY_{58}	—	August 23, 2003	Palomar	NEAT	·	6.4 km	MPC · JPL
191352	2003 QS_{66}	—	August 22, 2003	Socorro	LINEAR	·	5.1 km	MPC · JPL
191353	2003 QL_{67}	—	August 23, 2003	Socorro	LINEAR	TIR	7.4 km	MPC · JPL
191354	2003 QD_{69}	—	August 23, 2003	Palomar	NEAT	·	4.5 km	MPC · JPL
191355	2003 QZ_{73}	—	August 24, 2003	Socorro	LINEAR	·	5.6 km	MPC · JPL
191356	2003 QW_{75}	—	August 24, 2003	Socorro	LINEAR	·	4.1 km	MPC · JPL
191357	2003 QE_{79}	—	August 24, 2003	Socorro	LINEAR	JUN	1.8 km	MPC · JPL
191358	2003 QH_{80}	—	August 22, 2003	Palomar	NEAT	KOR	1.9 km	MPC · JPL
191359	2003 QR_{81}	—	August 23, 2003	Palomar	NEAT	KOR	1.8 km	MPC · JPL
191360	2003 QZ_{84}	—	August 24, 2003	Socorro	LINEAR	EOS	3.3 km	MPC · JPL
191361	2003 QD_{87}	—	August 25, 2003	Socorro	LINEAR	·	5.2 km	MPC · JPL
191362	2003 QG_{87}	—	August 25, 2003	Socorro	LINEAR	·	3.1 km	MPC · JPL
191363	2003 QS_{93}	—	August 28, 2003	Haleakala	NEAT	·	3.7 km	MPC · JPL
191364	2003 QQ_{94}	—	August 28, 2003	Haleakala	NEAT	WAT	3.8 km	MPC · JPL
191365	2003 QA_{102}	—	August 30, 2003	Kitt Peak	Spacewatch	·	4.3 km	MPC · JPL
191366	2003 QB_{107}	—	August 31, 2003	Socorro	LINEAR	·	3.5 km	MPC · JPL
191367	2003 QD_{113}	—	August 31, 2003	Socorro	LINEAR	·	6.2 km	MPC · JPL
191368	2003 RQ_{5}	—	September 3, 2003	Socorro	LINEAR	TIR	5.2 km	MPC · JPL
191369	2003 RR_{7}	—	September 3, 2003	Reedy Creek	J. Broughton	·	3.7 km	MPC · JPL
191370	2003 RO_{9}	—	September 4, 2003	Socorro	LINEAR	EOS	4.2 km	MPC · JPL
191371	2003 RS_{9}	—	September 4, 2003	Campo Imperatore	CINEOS	·	4.4 km	MPC · JPL
191372	2003 RP_{13}	—	September 15, 2003	Palomar	NEAT	·	4.6 km	MPC · JPL
191373	2003 RD_{14}	—	September 15, 2003	Haleakala	NEAT	EOS	3.8 km	MPC · JPL
191374	2003 RK_{14}	—	September 14, 2003	Haleakala	NEAT	TEL	2.6 km	MPC · JPL
191375	2003 RO_{26}	—	September 3, 2003	Haleakala	NEAT	·	6.6 km	MPC · JPL
191376	2003 RZ_{26}	—	September 2, 2003	Socorro	LINEAR	KOR	2.3 km	MPC · JPL
191377	2003 SQ	—	September 16, 2003	Kitt Peak	Spacewatch	·	2.9 km	MPC · JPL
191378	2003 SJ_{4}	—	September 16, 2003	Kitt Peak	Spacewatch	·	5.7 km	MPC · JPL
191379	2003 SY_{7}	—	September 16, 2003	Palomar	NEAT	·	4.8 km	MPC · JPL
191380	2003 SH_{8}	—	September 16, 2003	Kitt Peak	Spacewatch	·	3.1 km	MPC · JPL
191381	2003 SD_{17}	—	September 18, 2003	Campo Imperatore	CINEOS	·	3.5 km	MPC · JPL
191382	2003 SR_{18}	—	September 16, 2003	Kitt Peak	Spacewatch	·	1.9 km	MPC · JPL
191383	2003 SM_{22}	—	September 16, 2003	Kitt Peak	Spacewatch	·	2.9 km	MPC · JPL
191384	2003 SZ_{27}	—	September 18, 2003	Palomar	NEAT	·	5.8 km	MPC · JPL
191385	2003 SU_{39}	—	September 16, 2003	Palomar	NEAT	·	4.2 km	MPC · JPL
191386	2003 SK_{40}	—	September 16, 2003	Palomar	NEAT	·	5.3 km	MPC · JPL
191387	2003 SO_{40}	—	September 16, 2003	Palomar	NEAT	·	3.9 km	MPC · JPL
191388	2003 SU_{40}	—	September 16, 2003	Palomar	NEAT	·	6.9 km	MPC · JPL
191389	2003 SQ_{42}	—	September 16, 2003	Anderson Mesa	LONEOS	·	3.3 km	MPC · JPL
191390	2003 SH_{44}	—	September 16, 2003	Anderson Mesa	LONEOS	·	2.6 km	MPC · JPL
191391	2003 SR_{44}	—	September 16, 2003	Anderson Mesa	LONEOS	·	5.3 km	MPC · JPL
191392	2003 SC_{45}	—	September 16, 2003	Anderson Mesa	LONEOS	·	4.2 km	MPC · JPL
191393	2003 SO_{47}	—	September 17, 2003	Haleakala	NEAT	·	6.7 km	MPC · JPL
191394	2003 SN_{48}	—	September 18, 2003	Palomar	NEAT	·	4.2 km	MPC · JPL
191395	2003 SQ_{48}	—	September 18, 2003	Palomar	NEAT	·	6.1 km	MPC · JPL
191396	2003 SB_{50}	—	September 18, 2003	Palomar	NEAT	·	3.2 km	MPC · JPL
191397	2003 ST_{59}	—	September 17, 2003	Anderson Mesa	LONEOS	·	3.4 km	MPC · JPL
191398	2003 SH_{63}	—	September 17, 2003	Socorro	LINEAR	TEL	2.2 km	MPC · JPL
191399	2003 SO_{67}	—	September 19, 2003	Socorro	LINEAR	·	6.6 km	MPC · JPL
191400	2003 SZ_{70}	—	September 18, 2003	Kitt Peak	Spacewatch	·	3.9 km	MPC · JPL

== 191401–191500 ==
back to top

Designation			Discovery			Properties		Ref
Permanent	Provisional	Named after	Date	Site	Discoverer(s)	Category	Diam.	Ref
191401	2003 SZ_{73}	—	September 18, 2003	Kitt Peak	Spacewatch	·	4.1 km	MPC · JPL
191402	2003 SM_{76}	—	September 18, 2003	Kitt Peak	Spacewatch	·	4.0 km	MPC · JPL
191403	2003 SB_{78}	—	September 19, 2003	Kitt Peak	Spacewatch	·	3.6 km	MPC · JPL
191404	2003 SZ_{79}	—	September 19, 2003	Kitt Peak	Spacewatch	·	3.4 km	MPC · JPL
191405	2003 SZ_{81}	—	September 17, 2003	Kitt Peak	Spacewatch	VER	6.0 km	MPC · JPL
191406	2003 SD_{82}	—	September 17, 2003	Kitt Peak	Spacewatch	·	2.3 km	MPC · JPL
191407	2003 SJ_{86}	—	September 16, 2003	Palomar	NEAT	NAE	5.2 km	MPC · JPL
191408	2003 SP_{86}	—	September 16, 2003	Palomar	NEAT	EOS	3.8 km	MPC · JPL
191409	2003 SJ_{88}	—	September 18, 2003	Campo Imperatore	CINEOS	KOR	2.2 km	MPC · JPL
191410	2003 SS_{92}	—	September 18, 2003	Kitt Peak	Spacewatch	·	5.8 km	MPC · JPL
191411	2003 SW_{93}	—	September 18, 2003	Kitt Peak	Spacewatch	·	5.0 km	MPC · JPL
191412	2003 SX_{103}	—	September 20, 2003	Socorro	LINEAR	·	2.6 km	MPC · JPL
191413	2003 SQ_{104}	—	September 20, 2003	Socorro	LINEAR	·	4.0 km	MPC · JPL
191414	2003 SW_{109}	—	September 20, 2003	Kitt Peak	Spacewatch	·	3.2 km	MPC · JPL
191415	2003 SA_{110}	—	September 20, 2003	Palomar	NEAT	HYG	5.9 km	MPC · JPL
191416	2003 SZ_{119}	—	September 17, 2003	Kitt Peak	Spacewatch	·	5.1 km	MPC · JPL
191417	2003 SU_{137}	—	September 21, 2003	Campo Imperatore	CINEOS	·	3.7 km	MPC · JPL
191418	2003 SW_{138}	—	September 20, 2003	Palomar	NEAT	·	4.2 km	MPC · JPL
191419	2003 SZ_{138}	—	September 21, 2003	Socorro	LINEAR	EMA	7.7 km	MPC · JPL
191420	2003 SN_{139}	—	September 18, 2003	Socorro	LINEAR	·	4.3 km	MPC · JPL
191421	2003 SM_{146}	—	September 20, 2003	Palomar	NEAT	·	5.6 km	MPC · JPL
191422	2003 SW_{146}	—	September 20, 2003	Palomar	NEAT	EOS	3.7 km	MPC · JPL
191423	2003 SX_{146}	—	September 20, 2003	Palomar	NEAT	·	5.7 km	MPC · JPL
191424	2003 SA_{147}	—	September 20, 2003	Palomar	NEAT	·	7.2 km	MPC · JPL
191425	2003 SO_{148}	—	September 16, 2003	Kitt Peak	Spacewatch	·	3.9 km	MPC · JPL
191426	2003 SR_{149}	—	September 17, 2003	Socorro	LINEAR	EOS	3.6 km	MPC · JPL
191427	2003 SC_{154}	—	September 19, 2003	Anderson Mesa	LONEOS	·	6.5 km	MPC · JPL
191428	2003 SC_{155}	—	September 19, 2003	Anderson Mesa	LONEOS	EOS	3.6 km	MPC · JPL
191429	2003 SL_{157}	—	September 19, 2003	Anderson Mesa	LONEOS	HOF	4.2 km	MPC · JPL
191430	2003 SH_{159}	—	September 21, 2003	Socorro	LINEAR	NAE	5.4 km	MPC · JPL
191431	2003 SZ_{159}	—	September 20, 2003	Palomar	NEAT	·	3.8 km	MPC · JPL
191432	2003 SJ_{163}	—	September 19, 2003	Kitt Peak	Spacewatch	·	4.5 km	MPC · JPL
191433	2003 SW_{168}	—	September 23, 2003	Haleakala	NEAT	·	2.9 km	MPC · JPL
191434	2003 SZ_{172}	—	September 18, 2003	Socorro	LINEAR	·	3.6 km	MPC · JPL
191435	2003 SX_{175}	—	September 18, 2003	Palomar	NEAT	·	4.6 km	MPC · JPL
191436	2003 SD_{177}	—	September 18, 2003	Palomar	NEAT	·	3.2 km	MPC · JPL
191437	2003 SR_{177}	—	September 18, 2003	Palomar	NEAT	·	5.9 km	MPC · JPL
191438	2003 SP_{178}	—	September 19, 2003	Socorro	LINEAR	·	5.3 km	MPC · JPL
191439	2003 SE_{182}	—	September 20, 2003	Socorro	LINEAR	·	5.5 km	MPC · JPL
191440	2003 SO_{182}	—	September 20, 2003	Campo Imperatore	CINEOS	·	5.3 km	MPC · JPL
191441	2003 ST_{185}	—	September 22, 2003	Anderson Mesa	LONEOS	EOS ·	6.2 km	MPC · JPL
191442	2003 SG_{189}	—	September 22, 2003	Anderson Mesa	LONEOS	·	4.6 km	MPC · JPL
191443	2003 SG_{192}	—	September 20, 2003	Campo Imperatore	CINEOS	VER	6.0 km	MPC · JPL
191444	2003 SV_{193}	—	September 20, 2003	Socorro	LINEAR	EOS	2.6 km	MPC · JPL
191445	2003 SG_{194}	—	September 20, 2003	Anderson Mesa	LONEOS	·	3.6 km	MPC · JPL
191446	2003 SK_{199}	—	September 21, 2003	Anderson Mesa	LONEOS	·	6.1 km	MPC · JPL
191447	2003 SV_{201}	—	September 26, 2003	Desert Eagle	W. K. Y. Yeung	·	6.7 km	MPC · JPL
191448	2003 SC_{203}	—	September 22, 2003	Anderson Mesa	LONEOS	·	4.9 km	MPC · JPL
191449	2003 ST_{208}	—	September 23, 2003	Palomar	NEAT	·	4.2 km	MPC · JPL
191450	2003 SU_{210}	—	September 23, 2003	Palomar	NEAT	·	3.6 km	MPC · JPL
191451	2003 SD_{212}	—	September 25, 2003	Palomar	NEAT	EOS	5.3 km	MPC · JPL
191452	2003 SL_{216}	—	September 26, 2003	Socorro	LINEAR	THM	5.2 km	MPC · JPL
191453	2003 SZ_{217}	—	September 27, 2003	Desert Eagle	W. K. Y. Yeung	·	6.7 km	MPC · JPL
191454	2003 SD_{221}	—	September 28, 2003	Socorro	LINEAR	H	920 m	MPC · JPL
191455	2003 ST_{225}	—	September 26, 2003	Socorro	LINEAR	·	3.5 km	MPC · JPL
191456	2003 SR_{226}	—	September 26, 2003	Socorro	LINEAR	·	2.5 km	MPC · JPL
191457	2003 ST_{231}	—	September 24, 2003	Palomar	NEAT	·	5.5 km	MPC · JPL
191458	2003 SS_{236}	—	September 26, 2003	Socorro	LINEAR	KOR	2.1 km	MPC · JPL
191459	2003 SL_{254}	—	September 27, 2003	Kitt Peak	Spacewatch	·	6.3 km	MPC · JPL
191460	2003 SE_{258}	—	September 28, 2003	Kitt Peak	Spacewatch	·	3.7 km	MPC · JPL
191461	2003 SD_{266}	—	September 29, 2003	Socorro	LINEAR	VER ·	3.8 km	MPC · JPL
191462	2003 SF_{266}	—	September 29, 2003	Socorro	LINEAR	AGN	1.8 km	MPC · JPL
191463	2003 SJ_{266}	—	September 29, 2003	Socorro	LINEAR	EOS	2.8 km	MPC · JPL
191464	2003 SL_{269}	—	September 26, 2003	Goodricke-Pigott	R. A. Tucker	·	4.7 km	MPC · JPL
191465	2003 SY_{269}	—	September 24, 2003	Haleakala	NEAT	·	3.5 km	MPC · JPL
191466	2003 SB_{273}	—	September 27, 2003	Socorro	LINEAR	·	4.9 km	MPC · JPL
191467	2003 SD_{280}	—	September 18, 2003	Palomar	NEAT	URS	6.1 km	MPC · JPL
191468	2003 SB_{282}	—	September 19, 2003	Socorro	LINEAR	·	3.4 km	MPC · JPL
191469	2003 SL_{286}	—	September 21, 2003	Palomar	NEAT	·	5.3 km	MPC · JPL
191470	2003 SM_{286}	—	September 21, 2003	Palomar	NEAT	EUP	6.3 km	MPC · JPL
191471	2003 SE_{289}	—	September 28, 2003	Socorro	LINEAR	·	3.8 km	MPC · JPL
191472	2003 ST_{291}	—	September 30, 2003	Socorro	LINEAR	EOS	4.8 km	MPC · JPL
191473	2003 SL_{292}	—	September 25, 2003	Palomar	NEAT	EOS	4.5 km	MPC · JPL
191474	2003 SO_{292}	—	September 25, 2003	Palomar	NEAT	·	3.0 km	MPC · JPL
191475	2003 SU_{292}	—	September 26, 2003	Socorro	LINEAR	TIR	3.5 km	MPC · JPL
191476	2003 SX_{296}	—	September 16, 2003	Palomar	NEAT	·	6.2 km	MPC · JPL
191477	2003 SE_{297}	—	September 18, 2003	Haleakala	NEAT	·	3.1 km	MPC · JPL
191478	2003 SP_{303}	—	September 17, 2003	Palomar	NEAT	·	5.3 km	MPC · JPL
191479	2003 SR_{308}	—	September 29, 2003	Anderson Mesa	LONEOS	·	7.0 km	MPC · JPL
191480	2003 SR_{310}	—	September 28, 2003	Haleakala	NEAT	·	6.2 km	MPC · JPL
191481	2003 SH_{312}	—	September 26, 2003	Goodricke-Pigott	R. A. Tucker	·	3.5 km	MPC · JPL
191482	2003 SJ_{312}	—	September 27, 2003	Goodricke-Pigott	R. A. Tucker	ANF	3.5 km	MPC · JPL
191483	2003 SH_{319}	—	September 21, 2003	Anderson Mesa	LONEOS	TIR	5.2 km	MPC · JPL
191484	2003 TA_{1}	—	October 3, 2003	Kingsnake	J. V. McClusky	·	7.9 km	MPC · JPL
191485	2003 TO_{2}	—	October 7, 2003	Wrightwood	J. W. Young	·	3.5 km	MPC · JPL
191486	2003 TL_{7}	—	October 1, 2003	Anderson Mesa	LONEOS	·	5.4 km	MPC · JPL
191487	2003 TM_{7}	—	October 1, 2003	Anderson Mesa	LONEOS	·	5.0 km	MPC · JPL
191488	2003 TN_{15}	—	October 15, 2003	Anderson Mesa	LONEOS	·	6.2 km	MPC · JPL
191489	2003 TW_{16}	—	October 14, 2003	Anderson Mesa	LONEOS	HYG	6.2 km	MPC · JPL
191490	2003 TQ_{20}	—	October 15, 2003	Palomar	NEAT	·	3.7 km	MPC · JPL
191491	2003 TF_{21}	—	October 15, 2003	Anderson Mesa	LONEOS	·	4.8 km	MPC · JPL
191492	2003 TH_{57}	—	October 5, 2003	Socorro	LINEAR	·	3.4 km	MPC · JPL
191493	2003 TT_{57}	—	October 14, 2003	Palomar	NEAT	·	4.1 km	MPC · JPL
191494 Berndkoch	2003 UE_{5}	Berndkoch	October 16, 2003	Mülheim-Ruhr	Martin, A.	·	4.1 km	MPC · JPL
191495	2003 UN_{11}	—	October 20, 2003	Socorro	LINEAR	·	5.4 km	MPC · JPL
191496	2003 UU_{21}	—	October 21, 2003	Kingsnake	J. V. McClusky	·	7.2 km	MPC · JPL
191497	2003 UL_{27}	—	October 23, 2003	Goodricke-Pigott	R. A. Tucker	·	6.2 km	MPC · JPL
191498	2003 UB_{37}	—	October 16, 2003	Palomar	NEAT	·	5.0 km	MPC · JPL
191499	2003 UA_{41}	—	October 16, 2003	Anderson Mesa	LONEOS	EMA	6.7 km	MPC · JPL
191500	2003 UR_{47}	—	October 24, 2003	Haleakala	NEAT	·	4.3 km	MPC · JPL

== 191501–191600 ==
back to top

Designation			Discovery			Properties		Ref
Permanent	Provisional	Named after	Date	Site	Discoverer(s)	Category	Diam.	Ref
191501	2003 UA_{48}	—	October 16, 2003	Kitt Peak	Spacewatch	·	4.3 km	MPC · JPL
191502	2003 UL_{48}	—	October 16, 2003	Anderson Mesa	LONEOS	·	4.5 km	MPC · JPL
191503	2003 UW_{48}	—	October 16, 2003	Anderson Mesa	LONEOS	HYG	6.4 km	MPC · JPL
191504	2003 UL_{54}	—	October 18, 2003	Palomar	NEAT	·	4.8 km	MPC · JPL
191505	2003 UQ_{57}	—	October 16, 2003	Palomar	NEAT	·	5.5 km	MPC · JPL
191506	2003 UT_{63}	—	October 16, 2003	Anderson Mesa	LONEOS	EOS	3.4 km	MPC · JPL
191507	2003 UK_{65}	—	October 16, 2003	Palomar	NEAT	·	3.1 km	MPC · JPL
191508	2003 UA_{73}	—	October 19, 2003	Kitt Peak	Spacewatch	·	4.0 km	MPC · JPL
191509	2003 UD_{83}	—	October 16, 2003	Anderson Mesa	LONEOS	·	6.0 km	MPC · JPL
191510	2003 UK_{85}	—	October 18, 2003	Kitt Peak	Spacewatch	THM	5.0 km	MPC · JPL
191511	2003 UT_{86}	—	October 18, 2003	Palomar	NEAT	·	6.9 km	MPC · JPL
191512	2003 UA_{87}	—	October 18, 2003	Palomar	NEAT	·	3.8 km	MPC · JPL
191513	2003 UJ_{89}	—	October 20, 2003	Kitt Peak	Spacewatch	·	3.5 km	MPC · JPL
191514	2003 UQ_{92}	—	October 20, 2003	Palomar	NEAT	EOS	3.8 km	MPC · JPL
191515	2003 UB_{111}	—	October 19, 2003	Haleakala	NEAT	·	5.0 km	MPC · JPL
191516	2003 US_{112}	—	October 20, 2003	Socorro	LINEAR	HYG	4.2 km	MPC · JPL
191517	2003 UK_{116}	—	October 21, 2003	Socorro	LINEAR	·	4.7 km	MPC · JPL
191518	2003 UA_{129}	—	October 21, 2003	Kitt Peak	Spacewatch	·	3.7 km	MPC · JPL
191519	2003 UD_{133}	—	October 20, 2003	Palomar	NEAT	·	2.6 km	MPC · JPL
191520	2003 UE_{148}	—	October 19, 2003	Kitt Peak	Spacewatch	·	3.9 km	MPC · JPL
191521	2003 UJ_{152}	—	October 21, 2003	Kitt Peak	Spacewatch	·	4.0 km	MPC · JPL
191522	2003 US_{158}	—	October 20, 2003	Kitt Peak	Spacewatch	THM	3.6 km	MPC · JPL
191523	2003 UD_{173}	—	October 20, 2003	Palomar	NEAT	VER	6.8 km	MPC · JPL
191524	2003 UN_{177}	—	October 21, 2003	Palomar	NEAT	·	4.5 km	MPC · JPL
191525	2003 UW_{183}	—	October 21, 2003	Palomar	NEAT	·	3.8 km	MPC · JPL
191526	2003 UV_{186}	—	October 22, 2003	Socorro	LINEAR	EOS	3.3 km	MPC · JPL
191527	2003 UA_{193}	—	October 20, 2003	Kitt Peak	Spacewatch	·	3.4 km	MPC · JPL
191528	2003 UV_{193}	—	October 20, 2003	Kitt Peak	Spacewatch	·	4.3 km	MPC · JPL
191529	2003 UX_{196}	—	October 21, 2003	Kitt Peak	Spacewatch	·	3.6 km	MPC · JPL
191530	2003 UX_{197}	—	October 21, 2003	Anderson Mesa	LONEOS	fast	4.6 km	MPC · JPL
191531	2003 UQ_{198}	—	October 21, 2003	Kitt Peak	Spacewatch	·	4.5 km	MPC · JPL
191532	2003 UV_{199}	—	October 21, 2003	Socorro	LINEAR	THM	2.8 km	MPC · JPL
191533	2003 UV_{208}	—	October 22, 2003	Kitt Peak	Spacewatch	·	5.9 km	MPC · JPL
191534	2003 UM_{211}	—	October 23, 2003	Kitt Peak	Spacewatch	·	7.0 km	MPC · JPL
191535	2003 UE_{218}	—	October 21, 2003	Socorro	LINEAR	·	3.9 km	MPC · JPL
191536	2003 UY_{222}	—	October 22, 2003	Socorro	LINEAR	THB	6.6 km	MPC · JPL
191537	2003 UL_{223}	—	October 22, 2003	Socorro	LINEAR	·	4.5 km	MPC · JPL
191538	2003 UR_{227}	—	October 23, 2003	Kitt Peak	Spacewatch	HYG	4.7 km	MPC · JPL
191539	2003 UL_{230}	—	October 23, 2003	Kitt Peak	Spacewatch	VER	4.1 km	MPC · JPL
191540	2003 UF_{236}	—	October 22, 2003	Kitt Peak	Spacewatch	·	5.8 km	MPC · JPL
191541	2003 UF_{238}	—	October 23, 2003	Haleakala	NEAT	·	8.3 km	MPC · JPL
191542	2003 UM_{244}	—	October 24, 2003	Kitt Peak	Spacewatch	·	7.6 km	MPC · JPL
191543	2003 UJ_{249}	—	October 25, 2003	Socorro	LINEAR	·	3.8 km	MPC · JPL
191544	2003 UA_{255}	—	October 25, 2003	Kitt Peak	Spacewatch	THM	3.4 km	MPC · JPL
191545	2003 UZ_{261}	—	October 26, 2003	Socorro	LINEAR	·	5.8 km	MPC · JPL
191546	2003 UV_{268}	—	October 28, 2003	Socorro	LINEAR	·	3.6 km	MPC · JPL
191547	2003 UB_{269}	—	October 28, 2003	Haleakala	NEAT	·	7.0 km	MPC · JPL
191548	2003 UG_{278}	—	October 25, 2003	Socorro	LINEAR	·	6.0 km	MPC · JPL
191549	2003 UL_{293}	—	October 18, 2003	Socorro	LINEAR	·	3.4 km	MPC · JPL
191550	2003 UL_{299}	—	October 16, 2003	Kitt Peak	Spacewatch	·	2.6 km	MPC · JPL
191551 Glücklich	2003 VK_{1}	Glücklich	November 6, 2003	Piszkéstető	K. Sárneczky, B. Sipőcz	·	4.3 km	MPC · JPL
191552	2003 VC_{8}	—	November 14, 2003	Palomar	NEAT	AGN	1.7 km	MPC · JPL
191553	2003 WV_{14}	—	November 16, 2003	Kitt Peak	Spacewatch	·	4.3 km	MPC · JPL
191554	2003 WC_{15}	—	November 16, 2003	Kitt Peak	Spacewatch	·	4.3 km	MPC · JPL
191555	2003 WC_{20}	—	November 19, 2003	Socorro	LINEAR	·	3.5 km	MPC · JPL
191556	2003 WM_{44}	—	November 19, 2003	Palomar	NEAT	·	3.8 km	MPC · JPL
191557	2003 WT_{63}	—	November 19, 2003	Kitt Peak	Spacewatch	·	3.2 km	MPC · JPL
191558	2003 WO_{65}	—	November 19, 2003	Kitt Peak	Spacewatch	·	8.2 km	MPC · JPL
191559	2003 WE_{69}	—	November 19, 2003	Kitt Peak	Spacewatch	·	6.1 km	MPC · JPL
191560	2003 WR_{69}	—	November 19, 2003	Kitt Peak	Spacewatch	THM	3.8 km	MPC · JPL
191561	2003 WT_{74}	—	November 20, 2003	Socorro	LINEAR	·	5.1 km	MPC · JPL
191562	2003 WD_{81}	—	November 20, 2003	Socorro	LINEAR	·	6.2 km	MPC · JPL
191563	2003 WJ_{102}	—	November 21, 2003	Palomar	NEAT	·	5.5 km	MPC · JPL
191564	2003 WZ_{112}	—	November 20, 2003	Socorro	LINEAR	HYG	4.7 km	MPC · JPL
191565	2003 WX_{128}	—	November 21, 2003	Palomar	NEAT	·	4.8 km	MPC · JPL
191566	2003 WN_{139}	—	November 21, 2003	Socorro	LINEAR	H	1.1 km	MPC · JPL
191567	2003 WX_{146}	—	November 23, 2003	Socorro	LINEAR	·	1.6 km	MPC · JPL
191568	2003 WR_{151}	—	November 26, 2003	Socorro	LINEAR	THM	3.2 km	MPC · JPL
191569	2003 WZ_{153}	—	November 29, 2003	Socorro	LINEAR	H	890 m	MPC · JPL
191570	2003 WQ_{162}	—	November 30, 2003	Socorro	LINEAR	·	3.9 km	MPC · JPL
191571	2003 WX_{170}	—	November 21, 2003	Catalina	CSS	·	6.8 km	MPC · JPL
191572	2003 WU_{189}	—	November 22, 2003	Catalina	CSS	·	6.9 km	MPC · JPL
191573	2003 XZ_{10}	—	December 10, 2003	Palomar	NEAT	·	6.2 km	MPC · JPL
191574	2003 XF_{14}	—	December 15, 2003	Socorro	LINEAR	H	880 m	MPC · JPL
191575	2003 XP_{25}	—	December 1, 2003	Socorro	LINEAR	·	2.5 km	MPC · JPL
191576	2003 XM_{30}	—	December 1, 2003	Kitt Peak	Spacewatch	·	4.1 km	MPC · JPL
191577	2003 XU_{32}	—	December 1, 2003	Kitt Peak	Spacewatch	THM	4.1 km	MPC · JPL
191578	2003 XH_{35}	—	December 3, 2003	Socorro	LINEAR	EOS	3.7 km	MPC · JPL
191579	2003 YB_{6}	—	December 17, 2003	Socorro	LINEAR	·	5.8 km	MPC · JPL
191580	2003 YR_{53}	—	December 19, 2003	Socorro	LINEAR	·	4.4 km	MPC · JPL
191581	2003 YC_{64}	—	December 19, 2003	Socorro	LINEAR	THM	3.1 km	MPC · JPL
191582 Kikadolfi	2003 YK_{69}	Kikadolfi	December 20, 2003	San Marcello	L. Tesi, Fagioli, G.	·	3.8 km	MPC · JPL
191583	2003 YF_{105}	—	December 22, 2003	Socorro	LINEAR	·	7.6 km	MPC · JPL
191584	2004 BA_{143}	—	January 19, 2004	Kitt Peak	Spacewatch	·	2.8 km	MPC · JPL
191585	2004 CO_{63}	—	February 12, 2004	Palomar	NEAT	EOS	3.2 km	MPC · JPL
191586	2004 DU_{49}	—	February 22, 2004	Socorro	LINEAR	H	1.0 km	MPC · JPL
191587	2004 EJ_{6}	—	March 12, 2004	Palomar	NEAT	·	810 m	MPC · JPL
191588	2004 EO_{73}	—	March 15, 2004	Catalina	CSS	·	1.0 km	MPC · JPL
191589	2004 FQ_{5}	—	March 19, 2004	Palomar	NEAT	·	1.9 km	MPC · JPL
191590	2004 FN_{29}	—	March 24, 2004	Bergisch Gladbach	W. Bickel	·	990 m	MPC · JPL
191591	2004 FR_{38}	—	March 17, 2004	Socorro	LINEAR	·	1.1 km	MPC · JPL
191592	2004 FX_{46}	—	March 17, 2004	Socorro	LINEAR	·	1.1 km	MPC · JPL
191593	2004 FD_{68}	—	March 20, 2004	Socorro	LINEAR	·	1.6 km	MPC · JPL
191594	2004 FC_{90}	—	March 20, 2004	Socorro	LINEAR	·	1.1 km	MPC · JPL
191595	2004 FF_{109}	—	March 24, 2004	Anderson Mesa	LONEOS	·	1.2 km	MPC · JPL
191596	2004 FX_{121}	—	March 24, 2004	Anderson Mesa	LONEOS	BAP	1 km	MPC · JPL
191597	2004 FX_{125}	—	March 27, 2004	Socorro	LINEAR	·	930 m	MPC · JPL
191598	2004 FT_{142}	—	March 27, 2004	Socorro	LINEAR	V	1.0 km	MPC · JPL
191599	2004 FN_{143}	—	March 28, 2004	Socorro	LINEAR	·	1.9 km	MPC · JPL
191600	2004 FW_{146}	—	March 22, 2004	Socorro	LINEAR	·	1.8 km	MPC · JPL

== 191601–191700 ==
back to top

Designation			Discovery			Properties		Ref
Permanent	Provisional	Named after	Date	Site	Discoverer(s)	Category	Diam.	Ref
191601	2004 GY_{13}	—	April 13, 2004	Catalina	CSS	V	1.1 km	MPC · JPL
191602	2004 GB_{30}	—	April 12, 2004	Kitt Peak	Spacewatch	·	700 m	MPC · JPL
191603	2004 GH_{37}	—	April 14, 2004	Anderson Mesa	LONEOS	·	1.2 km	MPC · JPL
191604	2004 GL_{48}	—	April 12, 2004	Kitt Peak	Spacewatch	·	910 m	MPC · JPL
191605	2004 GA_{59}	—	April 12, 2004	Palomar	NEAT	·	1.1 km	MPC · JPL
191606	2004 GN_{74}	—	April 15, 2004	Palomar	NEAT	·	1.2 km	MPC · JPL
191607	2004 HD_{7}	—	April 16, 2004	Palomar	NEAT	·	1.6 km	MPC · JPL
191608	2004 HP_{10}	—	April 17, 2004	Socorro	LINEAR	PHO	1.6 km	MPC · JPL
191609	2004 HA_{18}	—	April 17, 2004	Socorro	LINEAR	·	1.2 km	MPC · JPL
191610	2004 HW_{24}	—	April 19, 2004	Socorro	LINEAR	·	920 m	MPC · JPL
191611	2004 HU_{45}	—	April 21, 2004	Socorro	LINEAR	PHO	1.4 km	MPC · JPL
191612	2004 HT_{48}	—	April 22, 2004	Siding Spring	SSS	·	1.0 km	MPC · JPL
191613	2004 HS_{50}	—	April 23, 2004	Kitt Peak	Spacewatch	·	1.1 km	MPC · JPL
191614	2004 JH_{6}	—	May 8, 2004	Palomar	NEAT	·	1.1 km	MPC · JPL
191615	2004 JE_{7}	—	May 8, 2004	Palomar	NEAT	·	1.2 km	MPC · JPL
191616	2004 JO_{22}	—	May 9, 2004	Palomar	NEAT	V	850 m	MPC · JPL
191617	2004 JN_{24}	—	May 15, 2004	Socorro	LINEAR	·	950 m	MPC · JPL
191618	2004 JB_{42}	—	May 15, 2004	Socorro	LINEAR	·	1 km	MPC · JPL
191619	2004 KJ_{7}	—	May 19, 2004	Socorro	LINEAR	NYS	1.4 km	MPC · JPL
191620	2004 LH_{5}	—	June 12, 2004	Palomar	NEAT	PHO	1.7 km	MPC · JPL
191621	2004 MN_{3}	—	June 19, 2004	Wrightwood	J. W. Young	MAS	960 m	MPC · JPL
191622	2004 MK_{8}	—	June 27, 2004	Siding Spring	SSS	MAS	1.0 km	MPC · JPL
191623	2004 NB_{1}	—	July 7, 2004	Campo Imperatore	CINEOS	fast	2.1 km	MPC · JPL
191624	2004 NJ_{1}	—	July 9, 2004	Palomar	NEAT	·	2.5 km	MPC · JPL
191625	2004 NO_{3}	—	July 12, 2004	Reedy Creek	J. Broughton	·	1.6 km	MPC · JPL
191626	2004 NF_{15}	—	July 11, 2004	Socorro	LINEAR	·	2.0 km	MPC · JPL
191627	2004 NF_{16}	—	July 11, 2004	Socorro	LINEAR	NYS	2.0 km	MPC · JPL
191628	2004 NE_{17}	—	July 11, 2004	Socorro	LINEAR	·	1.5 km	MPC · JPL
191629	2004 NJ_{17}	—	July 11, 2004	Socorro	LINEAR	·	1.7 km	MPC · JPL
191630	2004 NE_{22}	—	July 11, 2004	Socorro	LINEAR	·	1.8 km	MPC · JPL
191631	2004 NN_{27}	—	July 11, 2004	Socorro	LINEAR	·	2.4 km	MPC · JPL
191632	2004 NW_{27}	—	July 11, 2004	Socorro	LINEAR	·	1.3 km	MPC · JPL
191633	2004 OB_{12}	—	July 17, 2004	Reedy Creek	J. Broughton	·	1.6 km	MPC · JPL
191634	2004 PQ_{3}	—	August 3, 2004	Siding Spring	SSS	·	1.7 km	MPC · JPL
191635	2004 PD_{5}	—	August 6, 2004	Palomar	NEAT	·	2.4 km	MPC · JPL
191636	2004 PF_{9}	—	August 6, 2004	Palomar	NEAT	·	1.5 km	MPC · JPL
191637	2004 PX_{18}	—	August 8, 2004	Anderson Mesa	LONEOS	·	2.4 km	MPC · JPL
191638	2004 PO_{20}	—	August 6, 2004	Palomar	NEAT	·	1.7 km	MPC · JPL
191639	2004 PU_{23}	—	August 8, 2004	Socorro	LINEAR	·	2.0 km	MPC · JPL
191640	2004 PK_{24}	—	August 8, 2004	Socorro	LINEAR	·	1.8 km	MPC · JPL
191641	2004 PL_{24}	—	August 8, 2004	Socorro	LINEAR	·	1.6 km	MPC · JPL
191642	2004 PV_{29}	—	August 7, 2004	Palomar	NEAT	·	1.7 km	MPC · JPL
191643	2004 PX_{34}	—	August 8, 2004	Anderson Mesa	LONEOS	MAS	990 m	MPC · JPL
191644	2004 PZ_{36}	—	August 9, 2004	Socorro	LINEAR	·	1.7 km	MPC · JPL
191645	2004 PQ_{38}	—	August 9, 2004	Socorro	LINEAR	MAS	1.1 km	MPC · JPL
191646	2004 PP_{40}	—	August 9, 2004	Socorro	LINEAR	V	1.1 km	MPC · JPL
191647	2004 PK_{43}	—	August 6, 2004	Palomar	NEAT	V	1.1 km	MPC · JPL
191648	2004 PP_{45}	—	August 7, 2004	Palomar	NEAT	·	1.8 km	MPC · JPL
191649	2004 PX_{46}	—	August 8, 2004	Campo Imperatore	CINEOS	·	1.8 km	MPC · JPL
191650	2004 PC_{51}	—	August 8, 2004	Socorro	LINEAR	·	2.1 km	MPC · JPL
191651	2004 PU_{56}	—	August 9, 2004	Socorro	LINEAR	·	2.2 km	MPC · JPL
191652	2004 PF_{57}	—	August 9, 2004	Socorro	LINEAR	·	2.0 km	MPC · JPL
191653	2004 PN_{69}	—	August 7, 2004	Palomar	NEAT	·	1.8 km	MPC · JPL
191654	2004 PQ_{71}	—	August 8, 2004	Socorro	LINEAR	·	1.7 km	MPC · JPL
191655	2004 PT_{73}	—	August 8, 2004	Socorro	LINEAR	·	1.9 km	MPC · JPL
191656	2004 PY_{81}	—	August 10, 2004	Socorro	LINEAR	·	1.3 km	MPC · JPL
191657	2004 PK_{84}	—	August 10, 2004	Socorro	LINEAR	·	1.9 km	MPC · JPL
191658	2004 PG_{91}	—	August 11, 2004	Socorro	LINEAR	·	2.4 km	MPC · JPL
191659	2004 PK_{101}	—	August 11, 2004	Socorro	LINEAR	·	2.7 km	MPC · JPL
191660	2004 PL_{101}	—	August 11, 2004	Socorro	LINEAR	·	1.7 km	MPC · JPL
191661	2004 PP_{101}	—	August 11, 2004	Socorro	LINEAR	·	3.3 km	MPC · JPL
191662	2004 PU_{102}	—	August 12, 2004	Socorro	LINEAR	·	3.3 km	MPC · JPL
191663	2004 PG_{103}	—	August 12, 2004	Socorro	LINEAR	·	2.5 km	MPC · JPL
191664	2004 PQ_{103}	—	August 12, 2004	Socorro	LINEAR	·	4.5 km	MPC · JPL
191665	2004 PA_{104}	—	August 12, 2004	Socorro	LINEAR	·	2.7 km	MPC · JPL
191666	2004 PQ_{112}	—	August 3, 2004	Siding Spring	SSS	·	2.9 km	MPC · JPL
191667	2004 QZ	—	August 16, 2004	Palomar	NEAT	·	2.4 km	MPC · JPL
191668	2004 QF_{4}	—	August 19, 2004	Siding Spring	SSS	·	1.8 km	MPC · JPL
191669	2004 QD_{11}	—	August 21, 2004	Siding Spring	SSS	·	1.7 km	MPC · JPL
191670	2004 QV_{11}	—	August 21, 2004	Siding Spring	SSS	KON	3.4 km	MPC · JPL
191671	2004 QC_{20}	—	August 25, 2004	Wise	Wise	GEF	2.3 km	MPC · JPL
191672	2004 RT_{10}	—	September 7, 2004	Vicques	M. Ory	·	1.5 km	MPC · JPL
191673	2004 RR_{19}	—	September 7, 2004	Palomar	NEAT	·	2.0 km	MPC · JPL
191674	2004 RG_{35}	—	September 7, 2004	Socorro	LINEAR	·	1.8 km	MPC · JPL
191675	2004 RP_{38}	—	September 7, 2004	Kitt Peak	Spacewatch	·	1.2 km	MPC · JPL
191676	2004 RR_{46}	—	September 8, 2004	Socorro	LINEAR	·	1.4 km	MPC · JPL
191677	2004 RH_{47}	—	September 8, 2004	Socorro	LINEAR	·	1.3 km	MPC · JPL
191678	2004 RS_{58}	—	September 8, 2004	Socorro	LINEAR	·	1.3 km	MPC · JPL
191679	2004 RV_{63}	—	September 8, 2004	Socorro	LINEAR	·	1.3 km	MPC · JPL
191680	2004 RE_{67}	—	September 8, 2004	Socorro	LINEAR	·	1.5 km	MPC · JPL
191681	2004 RJ_{75}	—	September 8, 2004	Socorro	LINEAR	RAF	1.3 km	MPC · JPL
191682	2004 RG_{76}	—	September 8, 2004	Socorro	LINEAR	·	1.9 km	MPC · JPL
191683	2004 RX_{76}	—	September 8, 2004	Socorro	LINEAR	·	3.3 km	MPC · JPL
191684	2004 RK_{78}	—	September 8, 2004	Socorro	LINEAR	·	1.7 km	MPC · JPL
191685	2004 RO_{79}	—	September 8, 2004	Palomar	NEAT	·	2.9 km	MPC · JPL
191686	2004 RA_{86}	—	September 7, 2004	Socorro	LINEAR	·	3.8 km	MPC · JPL
191687	2004 RK_{95}	—	September 8, 2004	Socorro	LINEAR	·	1.5 km	MPC · JPL
191688	2004 RC_{107}	—	September 9, 2004	Socorro	LINEAR	·	1.3 km	MPC · JPL
191689	2004 RZ_{136}	—	September 8, 2004	Campo Imperatore	CINEOS	·	1.8 km	MPC · JPL
191690	2004 RY_{142}	—	September 8, 2004	Palomar	NEAT	·	2.7 km	MPC · JPL
191691	2004 RK_{144}	—	September 8, 2004	Palomar	NEAT	·	2.5 km	MPC · JPL
191692	2004 RN_{149}	—	September 9, 2004	Socorro	LINEAR	·	1.8 km	MPC · JPL
191693	2004 RG_{150}	—	September 9, 2004	Socorro	LINEAR	·	1.9 km	MPC · JPL
191694	2004 RL_{151}	—	September 9, 2004	Socorro	LINEAR	(5)	1.9 km	MPC · JPL
191695	2004 RK_{154}	—	September 10, 2004	Socorro	LINEAR	·	2.1 km	MPC · JPL
191696	2004 RB_{160}	—	September 10, 2004	Socorro	LINEAR	·	2.8 km	MPC · JPL
191697	2004 RR_{162}	—	September 11, 2004	Socorro	LINEAR	·	4.5 km	MPC · JPL
191698	2004 RV_{163}	—	September 10, 2004	Socorro	LINEAR	·	1.9 km	MPC · JPL
191699	2004 RX_{167}	—	September 7, 2004	Kitt Peak	Spacewatch	·	1.7 km	MPC · JPL
191700	2004 RG_{168}	—	September 8, 2004	Socorro	LINEAR	·	2.2 km	MPC · JPL

== 191701–191800 ==
back to top

Designation			Discovery			Properties		Ref
Permanent	Provisional	Named after	Date	Site	Discoverer(s)	Category	Diam.	Ref
191701	2004 RP_{169}	—	September 8, 2004	Socorro	LINEAR	·	1.6 km	MPC · JPL
191702	2004 RQ_{170}	—	September 8, 2004	Palomar	NEAT	·	3.2 km	MPC · JPL
191703	2004 RB_{172}	—	September 9, 2004	Socorro	LINEAR	·	1.5 km	MPC · JPL
191704	2004 RF_{172}	—	September 9, 2004	Socorro	LINEAR	(5)	1.9 km	MPC · JPL
191705	2004 RR_{188}	—	September 10, 2004	Socorro	LINEAR	·	2.5 km	MPC · JPL
191706	2004 RX_{188}	—	September 10, 2004	Socorro	LINEAR	·	2.7 km	MPC · JPL
191707	2004 RY_{192}	—	September 10, 2004	Socorro	LINEAR	ADE	2.4 km	MPC · JPL
191708	2004 RQ_{194}	—	September 10, 2004	Socorro	LINEAR	·	2.7 km	MPC · JPL
191709	2004 RT_{194}	—	September 10, 2004	Socorro	LINEAR	·	1.9 km	MPC · JPL
191710	2004 RW_{195}	—	September 10, 2004	Socorro	LINEAR	·	2.8 km	MPC · JPL
191711	2004 RQ_{196}	—	September 10, 2004	Socorro	LINEAR	·	2.7 km	MPC · JPL
191712	2004 RT_{196}	—	September 10, 2004	Socorro	LINEAR	·	2.0 km	MPC · JPL
191713	2004 RE_{199}	—	September 10, 2004	Socorro	LINEAR	·	3.7 km	MPC · JPL
191714	2004 RX_{199}	—	September 10, 2004	Socorro	LINEAR	·	3.2 km	MPC · JPL
191715	2004 RG_{201}	—	September 10, 2004	Socorro	LINEAR	ADE	3.7 km	MPC · JPL
191716	2004 RX_{206}	—	September 11, 2004	Socorro	LINEAR	·	2.7 km	MPC · JPL
191717	2004 RZ_{214}	—	September 11, 2004	Socorro	LINEAR	EUN	1.8 km	MPC · JPL
191718	2004 RL_{218}	—	September 11, 2004	Socorro	LINEAR	EUN	2.0 km	MPC · JPL
191719	2004 RO_{220}	—	September 11, 2004	Socorro	LINEAR	·	2.5 km	MPC · JPL
191720	2004 RG_{224}	—	September 8, 2004	Socorro	LINEAR	·	3.7 km	MPC · JPL
191721	2004 RP_{228}	—	September 9, 2004	Kitt Peak	Spacewatch	·	2.7 km	MPC · JPL
191722	2004 RZ_{229}	—	September 9, 2004	Kitt Peak	Spacewatch	·	1.5 km	MPC · JPL
191723	2004 RE_{237}	—	September 10, 2004	Kitt Peak	Spacewatch	·	2.1 km	MPC · JPL
191724	2004 RJ_{246}	—	September 10, 2004	Kitt Peak	Spacewatch	·	1.4 km	MPC · JPL
191725	2004 RM_{276}	—	September 13, 2004	Kitt Peak	Spacewatch	·	2.2 km	MPC · JPL
191726	2004 RV_{287}	—	September 15, 2004	7300 Observatory	W. K. Y. Yeung	·	1.7 km	MPC · JPL
191727	2004 RK_{293}	—	September 11, 2004	Socorro	LINEAR	·	1.9 km	MPC · JPL
191728	2004 RK_{305}	—	September 12, 2004	Socorro	LINEAR	·	1.6 km	MPC · JPL
191729	2004 RZ_{306}	—	September 12, 2004	Socorro	LINEAR	JUN	1.6 km	MPC · JPL
191730	2004 RL_{309}	—	September 13, 2004	Socorro	LINEAR	MAR	1.4 km	MPC · JPL
191731	2004 RZ_{309}	—	September 13, 2004	Socorro	LINEAR	·	1.9 km	MPC · JPL
191732	2004 RD_{310}	—	September 13, 2004	Socorro	LINEAR	MRX	1.9 km	MPC · JPL
191733	2004 RV_{312}	—	September 15, 2004	Kitt Peak	Spacewatch	·	2.0 km	MPC · JPL
191734	2004 RU_{323}	—	September 13, 2004	Socorro	LINEAR	·	3.3 km	MPC · JPL
191735	2004 RN_{325}	—	September 13, 2004	Socorro	LINEAR	·	3.6 km	MPC · JPL
191736	2004 RV_{325}	—	September 13, 2004	Socorro	LINEAR	·	2.8 km	MPC · JPL
191737	2004 RE_{326}	—	September 13, 2004	Socorro	LINEAR	EUN	2.0 km	MPC · JPL
191738	2004 RR_{333}	—	September 15, 2004	Anderson Mesa	LONEOS	·	2.6 km	MPC · JPL
191739	2004 RO_{338}	—	September 15, 2004	Kitt Peak	Spacewatch	·	1.8 km	MPC · JPL
191740	2004 SB_{12}	—	September 16, 2004	Siding Spring	SSS	·	2.4 km	MPC · JPL
191741	2004 SC_{12}	—	September 16, 2004	Siding Spring	SSS	·	2.6 km	MPC · JPL
191742	2004 SA_{13}	—	September 17, 2004	Anderson Mesa	LONEOS	EOS	2.9 km	MPC · JPL
191743	2004 SZ_{13}	—	September 17, 2004	Socorro	LINEAR	·	4.1 km	MPC · JPL
191744	2004 SX_{15}	—	September 17, 2004	Anderson Mesa	LONEOS	(5)	1.9 km	MPC · JPL
191745	2004 SM_{20}	—	September 17, 2004	Desert Eagle	W. K. Y. Yeung	·	1.8 km	MPC · JPL
191746	2004 SQ_{22}	—	September 17, 2004	Socorro	LINEAR	EUN	2.8 km	MPC · JPL
191747	2004 SV_{29}	—	September 17, 2004	Socorro	LINEAR	·	2.5 km	MPC · JPL
191748	2004 SZ_{40}	—	September 17, 2004	Socorro	LINEAR	·	2.8 km	MPC · JPL
191749	2004 SO_{42}	—	September 18, 2004	Socorro	LINEAR	·	2.1 km	MPC · JPL
191750	2004 ST_{48}	—	September 21, 2004	Socorro	LINEAR	EUN	2.1 km	MPC · JPL
191751	2004 SC_{50}	—	September 22, 2004	Socorro	LINEAR	·	2.4 km	MPC · JPL
191752	2004 SE_{50}	—	September 22, 2004	Socorro	LINEAR	MAS	980 m	MPC · JPL
191753	2004 SD_{51}	—	September 22, 2004	Kitt Peak	Spacewatch	·	1.6 km	MPC · JPL
191754	2004 SC_{52}	—	September 17, 2004	Socorro	LINEAR	·	4.2 km	MPC · JPL
191755	2004 SQ_{54}	—	September 22, 2004	Socorro	LINEAR	·	4.3 km	MPC · JPL
191756	2004 SU_{54}	—	September 22, 2004	Socorro	LINEAR	·	1.7 km	MPC · JPL
191757	2004 SP_{60}	—	September 16, 2004	Kitt Peak	Spacewatch	EOS	3.3 km	MPC · JPL
191758	2004 TV_{1}	—	October 3, 2004	Palomar	NEAT	·	2.2 km	MPC · JPL
191759	2004 TA_{12}	—	October 6, 2004	Goodricke-Pigott	R. A. Tucker	·	2.1 km	MPC · JPL
191760	2004 TH_{12}	—	October 7, 2004	Goodricke-Pigott	R. A. Tucker	·	1.5 km	MPC · JPL
191761	2004 TK_{23}	—	October 4, 2004	Kitt Peak	Spacewatch	·	1.9 km	MPC · JPL
191762	2004 TU_{34}	—	October 4, 2004	Anderson Mesa	LONEOS	·	1.8 km	MPC · JPL
191763	2004 TB_{42}	—	October 4, 2004	Kitt Peak	Spacewatch	·	2.5 km	MPC · JPL
191764	2004 TH_{45}	—	October 4, 2004	Kitt Peak	Spacewatch	·	1.8 km	MPC · JPL
191765	2004 TF_{48}	—	October 4, 2004	Kitt Peak	Spacewatch	HOF	3.6 km	MPC · JPL
191766	2004 TF_{50}	—	October 4, 2004	Kitt Peak	Spacewatch	·	2.8 km	MPC · JPL
191767	2004 TH_{51}	—	October 4, 2004	Kitt Peak	Spacewatch	·	1.7 km	MPC · JPL
191768	2004 TJ_{51}	—	October 4, 2004	Kitt Peak	Spacewatch	·	2.5 km	MPC · JPL
191769	2004 TB_{53}	—	October 4, 2004	Kitt Peak	Spacewatch	KOR	1.7 km	MPC · JPL
191770	2004 TA_{55}	—	October 4, 2004	Kitt Peak	Spacewatch	·	2.4 km	MPC · JPL
191771	2004 TH_{68}	—	October 5, 2004	Anderson Mesa	LONEOS	·	2.1 km	MPC · JPL
191772	2004 TE_{71}	—	October 6, 2004	Kitt Peak	Spacewatch	WIT	1.7 km	MPC · JPL
191773	2004 TM_{73}	—	October 6, 2004	Kitt Peak	Spacewatch	·	1.9 km	MPC · JPL
191774	2004 TA_{76}	—	October 6, 2004	Palomar	NEAT	·	1.8 km	MPC · JPL
191775 Poczobut	2004 TQ_{77}	Poczobut	October 12, 2004	Moletai	K. Černis, J. Zdanavičius	·	3.1 km	MPC · JPL
191776	2004 TC_{79}	—	October 4, 2004	Anderson Mesa	LONEOS	(5)	1.7 km	MPC · JPL
191777	2004 TN_{85}	—	October 5, 2004	Kitt Peak	Spacewatch	·	1.4 km	MPC · JPL
191778	2004 TA_{86}	—	October 5, 2004	Kitt Peak	Spacewatch	·	2.0 km	MPC · JPL
191779	2004 TT_{91}	—	October 5, 2004	Kitt Peak	Spacewatch	·	2.0 km	MPC · JPL
191780	2004 TA_{99}	—	October 5, 2004	Kitt Peak	Spacewatch	·	2.4 km	MPC · JPL
191781	2004 TS_{99}	—	October 5, 2004	Kitt Peak	Spacewatch	·	2.0 km	MPC · JPL
191782	2004 TW_{113}	—	October 7, 2004	Palomar	NEAT	NYS	2.2 km	MPC · JPL
191783	2004 TX_{115}	—	October 15, 2004	Goodricke-Pigott	Goodricke-Pigott	EUN ·	1.7 km	MPC · JPL
191784	2004 TP_{122}	—	October 7, 2004	Anderson Mesa	LONEOS	·	2.1 km	MPC · JPL
191785	2004 TP_{124}	—	October 7, 2004	Socorro	LINEAR	·	1.5 km	MPC · JPL
191786	2004 TZ_{125}	—	October 7, 2004	Socorro	LINEAR	·	1.7 km	MPC · JPL
191787	2004 TZ_{126}	—	October 7, 2004	Socorro	LINEAR	·	3.6 km	MPC · JPL
191788	2004 TQ_{131}	—	October 7, 2004	Anderson Mesa	LONEOS	·	2.0 km	MPC · JPL
191789	2004 TG_{132}	—	October 7, 2004	Anderson Mesa	LONEOS	·	3.5 km	MPC · JPL
191790	2004 TC_{134}	—	October 7, 2004	Palomar	NEAT	(1547)	3.4 km	MPC · JPL
191791	2004 TM_{134}	—	October 7, 2004	Palomar	NEAT	·	3.1 km	MPC · JPL
191792	2004 TV_{136}	—	October 8, 2004	Anderson Mesa	LONEOS	(5)	1.5 km	MPC · JPL
191793	2004 TK_{154}	—	October 6, 2004	Kitt Peak	Spacewatch	AST	3.0 km	MPC · JPL
191794	2004 TO_{161}	—	October 6, 2004	Kitt Peak	Spacewatch	·	3.1 km	MPC · JPL
191795	2004 TK_{170}	—	October 7, 2004	Socorro	LINEAR	·	3.2 km	MPC · JPL
191796	2004 TQ_{178}	—	October 7, 2004	Kitt Peak	Spacewatch	·	1.6 km	MPC · JPL
191797	2004 TQ_{203}	—	October 7, 2004	Kitt Peak	Spacewatch	·	2.4 km	MPC · JPL
191798	2004 TA_{205}	—	October 7, 2004	Kitt Peak	Spacewatch	·	3.2 km	MPC · JPL
191799	2004 TL_{205}	—	October 7, 2004	Kitt Peak	Spacewatch	GEF	2.2 km	MPC · JPL
191800	2004 TW_{211}	—	October 8, 2004	Kitt Peak	Spacewatch	·	2.2 km	MPC · JPL

== 191801–191900 ==
back to top

Designation			Discovery			Properties		Ref
Permanent	Provisional	Named after	Date	Site	Discoverer(s)	Category	Diam.	Ref
191801	2004 TC_{219}	—	October 5, 2004	Kitt Peak	Spacewatch	·	2.3 km	MPC · JPL
191802	2004 TZ_{220}	—	October 7, 2004	Socorro	LINEAR	·	2.5 km	MPC · JPL
191803	2004 TJ_{223}	—	October 7, 2004	Socorro	LINEAR	·	3.6 km	MPC · JPL
191804	2004 TX_{223}	—	October 8, 2004	Kitt Peak	Spacewatch	KON	2.9 km	MPC · JPL
191805	2004 TS_{229}	—	October 8, 2004	Kitt Peak	Spacewatch	·	1.6 km	MPC · JPL
191806	2004 TG_{247}	—	October 7, 2004	Socorro	LINEAR	·	4.9 km	MPC · JPL
191807	2004 TX_{247}	—	October 7, 2004	Socorro	LINEAR	EUN	1.9 km	MPC · JPL
191808	2004 TX_{261}	—	October 9, 2004	Socorro	LINEAR	(5)	2.1 km	MPC · JPL
191809	2004 TO_{263}	—	October 9, 2004	Kitt Peak	Spacewatch	·	2.5 km	MPC · JPL
191810	2004 TY_{276}	—	October 9, 2004	Kitt Peak	Spacewatch	·	3.7 km	MPC · JPL
191811	2004 TJ_{279}	—	October 10, 2004	Socorro	LINEAR	·	2.8 km	MPC · JPL
191812	2004 TV_{280}	—	October 10, 2004	Kitt Peak	Spacewatch	AST	2.1 km	MPC · JPL
191813	2004 TK_{286}	—	October 8, 2004	Kitt Peak	Spacewatch	·	1.7 km	MPC · JPL
191814	2004 TT_{292}	—	October 10, 2004	Socorro	LINEAR	·	2.8 km	MPC · JPL
191815	2004 TR_{294}	—	October 10, 2004	Kitt Peak	Spacewatch	·	2.9 km	MPC · JPL
191816	2004 TO_{295}	—	October 10, 2004	Kitt Peak	Spacewatch	·	2.4 km	MPC · JPL
191817	2004 TY_{302}	—	October 9, 2004	Socorro	LINEAR	·	3.9 km	MPC · JPL
191818	2004 TU_{306}	—	October 10, 2004	Socorro	LINEAR	·	3.3 km	MPC · JPL
191819	2004 TV_{321}	—	October 11, 2004	Kitt Peak	Spacewatch	·	3.0 km	MPC · JPL
191820	2004 TO_{326}	—	October 14, 2004	Palomar	NEAT	EUN	1.6 km	MPC · JPL
191821	2004 TT_{359}	—	October 9, 2004	Socorro	LINEAR	·	2.6 km	MPC · JPL
191822	2004 TY_{361}	—	October 14, 2004	Anderson Mesa	LONEOS	·	3.0 km	MPC · JPL
191823	2004 UX_{1}	—	October 16, 2004	Socorro	LINEAR	·	2.5 km	MPC · JPL
191824	2004 UA_{3}	—	October 18, 2004	Socorro	LINEAR	EUN	1.8 km	MPC · JPL
191825	2004 UV_{5}	—	October 20, 2004	Socorro	LINEAR	·	2.6 km	MPC · JPL
191826	2004 UZ_{7}	—	October 21, 2004	Socorro	LINEAR	·	2.6 km	MPC · JPL
191827	2004 UW_{9}	—	October 18, 2004	Socorro	LINEAR	EUN	2.2 km	MPC · JPL
191828	2004 VF	—	November 2, 2004	Palomar	NEAT	·	4.5 km	MPC · JPL
191829	2004 VR	—	November 2, 2004	Anderson Mesa	LONEOS	·	2.6 km	MPC · JPL
191830	2004 VC_{2}	—	November 2, 2004	Anderson Mesa	LONEOS	EUN	2.6 km	MPC · JPL
191831	2004 VO_{3}	—	November 3, 2004	Kitt Peak	Spacewatch	MIS	4.3 km	MPC · JPL
191832	2004 VS_{7}	—	November 3, 2004	Kitt Peak	Spacewatch	·	3.1 km	MPC · JPL
191833	2004 VY_{7}	—	November 3, 2004	Kitt Peak	Spacewatch	·	2.5 km	MPC · JPL
191834	2004 VT_{9}	—	November 3, 2004	Anderson Mesa	LONEOS	·	3.1 km	MPC · JPL
191835	2004 VU_{10}	—	November 3, 2004	Catalina	CSS	·	2.4 km	MPC · JPL
191836	2004 VG_{13}	—	November 3, 2004	Palomar	NEAT	·	3.8 km	MPC · JPL
191837	2004 VU_{13}	—	November 3, 2004	Catalina	CSS	·	3.1 km	MPC · JPL
191838	2004 VR_{14}	—	November 4, 2004	Catalina	CSS	·	3.3 km	MPC · JPL
191839	2004 VJ_{16}	—	November 4, 2004	Needville	J. Dellinger, D. Wells	·	2.3 km	MPC · JPL
191840	2004 VG_{17}	—	November 3, 2004	Kitt Peak	Spacewatch	·	3.3 km	MPC · JPL
191841	2004 VO_{20}	—	November 4, 2004	Catalina	CSS	·	3.3 km	MPC · JPL
191842	2004 VL_{24}	—	November 5, 2004	Needville	J. Dellinger	EOS	3.0 km	MPC · JPL
191843	2004 VD_{26}	—	November 4, 2004	Catalina	CSS	·	2.5 km	MPC · JPL
191844	2004 VY_{26}	—	November 4, 2004	Catalina	CSS	NEM	3.2 km	MPC · JPL
191845	2004 VG_{34}	—	November 3, 2004	Kitt Peak	Spacewatch	KOR	2.2 km	MPC · JPL
191846	2004 VO_{37}	—	November 4, 2004	Kitt Peak	Spacewatch	AST	2.2 km	MPC · JPL
191847	2004 VB_{39}	—	November 4, 2004	Kitt Peak	Spacewatch	·	2.2 km	MPC · JPL
191848	2004 VP_{47}	—	November 4, 2004	Kitt Peak	Spacewatch	HOF	3.8 km	MPC · JPL
191849	2004 VZ_{48}	—	November 4, 2004	Kitt Peak	Spacewatch	AGN	1.9 km	MPC · JPL
191850	2004 VV_{54}	—	November 7, 2004	Bergisch Gladbach	W. Bickel	·	2.5 km	MPC · JPL
191851	2004 VE_{57}	—	November 5, 2004	Socorro	LINEAR	·	3.0 km	MPC · JPL
191852	2004 VZ_{58}	—	November 9, 2004	Catalina	CSS	·	2.2 km	MPC · JPL
191853	2004 VH_{59}	—	November 9, 2004	Catalina	CSS	HOF	3.4 km	MPC · JPL
191854	2004 VV_{61}	—	November 6, 2004	Socorro	LINEAR	·	4.6 km	MPC · JPL
191855	2004 VX_{61}	—	November 6, 2004	Socorro	LINEAR	EUN	2.0 km	MPC · JPL
191856 Almáriván	2004 VW_{69}	Almáriván	November 11, 2004	Piszkéstető	K. Sárneczky	MRX	1.6 km	MPC · JPL
191857 Illéserzsébet	2004 VA_{70}	Illéserzsébet	November 12, 2004	Piszkéstető	K. Sárneczky	·	2.8 km	MPC · JPL
191858	2004 WV_{4}	—	November 18, 2004	Campo Imperatore	CINEOS	·	2.4 km	MPC · JPL
191859	2004 WJ_{7}	—	November 19, 2004	Socorro	LINEAR	WIT	1.9 km	MPC · JPL
191860	2004 WX_{8}	—	November 18, 2004	Socorro	LINEAR	·	2.4 km	MPC · JPL
191861	2004 XK_{8}	—	December 2, 2004	Palomar	NEAT	·	4.0 km	MPC · JPL
191862	2004 XQ_{10}	—	December 3, 2004	Kitt Peak	Spacewatch	GEF	2.2 km	MPC · JPL
191863	2004 XG_{19}	—	December 8, 2004	Socorro	LINEAR	·	990 m	MPC · JPL
191864	2004 XV_{22}	—	December 8, 2004	Socorro	LINEAR	·	2.3 km	MPC · JPL
191865	2004 XO_{28}	—	December 10, 2004	Socorro	LINEAR	·	5.2 km	MPC · JPL
191866	2004 XW_{31}	—	December 10, 2004	Kitt Peak	Spacewatch	·	3.4 km	MPC · JPL
191867	2004 XJ_{34}	—	December 11, 2004	Socorro	LINEAR	·	6.1 km	MPC · JPL
191868	2004 XD_{72}	—	December 14, 2004	Anderson Mesa	LONEOS	·	7.3 km	MPC · JPL
191869	2004 XH_{72}	—	December 14, 2004	Catalina	CSS	·	2.3 km	MPC · JPL
191870	2004 XT_{76}	—	December 10, 2004	Socorro	LINEAR	·	6.4 km	MPC · JPL
191871	2004 XP_{81}	—	December 10, 2004	Socorro	LINEAR	EOS	3.9 km	MPC · JPL
191872	2004 XW_{82}	—	December 11, 2004	Kitt Peak	Spacewatch	EOS	2.6 km	MPC · JPL
191873	2004 XR_{83}	—	December 11, 2004	Kitt Peak	Spacewatch	EOS	4.3 km	MPC · JPL
191874	2004 XR_{89}	—	December 11, 2004	Kitt Peak	Spacewatch	·	3.2 km	MPC · JPL
191875	2004 XY_{92}	—	December 11, 2004	Socorro	LINEAR	(5)	1.7 km	MPC · JPL
191876	2004 XC_{97}	—	December 11, 2004	Kitt Peak	Spacewatch	·	2.4 km	MPC · JPL
191877	2004 XQ_{101}	—	December 14, 2004	Catalina	CSS	·	3.6 km	MPC · JPL
191878	2004 XA_{103}	—	December 14, 2004	Anderson Mesa	LONEOS	·	2.2 km	MPC · JPL
191879	2004 XQ_{107}	—	December 11, 2004	Socorro	LINEAR	·	3.9 km	MPC · JPL
191880	2004 XJ_{108}	—	December 11, 2004	Socorro	LINEAR	(5)	2.2 km	MPC · JPL
191881	2004 XM_{108}	—	December 2, 2004	Catalina	CSS	EOS	3.8 km	MPC · JPL
191882	2004 XS_{108}	—	December 11, 2004	Socorro	LINEAR	·	3.6 km	MPC · JPL
191883	2004 XC_{144}	—	December 12, 2004	Socorro	LINEAR	EUN	2.4 km	MPC · JPL
191884	2004 XC_{145}	—	December 13, 2004	Socorro	LINEAR	·	2.6 km	MPC · JPL
191885	2004 XJ_{157}	—	December 14, 2004	Socorro	LINEAR	·	3.1 km	MPC · JPL
191886	2004 XR_{161}	—	December 15, 2004	Socorro	LINEAR	BRA	2.7 km	MPC · JPL
191887	2004 XU_{173}	—	December 10, 2004	Socorro	LINEAR	·	3.0 km	MPC · JPL
191888	2004 XP_{182}	—	December 2, 2004	Anderson Mesa	LONEOS	·	3.3 km	MPC · JPL
191889	2004 YK_{19}	—	December 18, 2004	Mount Lemmon	Mount Lemmon Survey	·	2.6 km	MPC · JPL
191890	2004 YA_{21}	—	December 18, 2004	Mount Lemmon	Mount Lemmon Survey	·	7.0 km	MPC · JPL
191891	2004 YA_{29}	—	December 16, 2004	Kitt Peak	Spacewatch	·	2.8 km	MPC · JPL
191892	2005 AZ_{11}	—	January 6, 2005	Socorro	LINEAR	EOS	3.4 km	MPC · JPL
191893	2005 AS_{17}	—	January 6, 2005	Socorro	LINEAR	·	6.3 km	MPC · JPL
191894	2005 AN_{20}	—	January 6, 2005	Socorro	LINEAR	EOS	3.6 km	MPC · JPL
191895	2005 AL_{31}	—	January 11, 2005	Socorro	LINEAR	·	5.0 km	MPC · JPL
191896	2005 AH_{51}	—	January 13, 2005	Catalina	CSS	·	3.1 km	MPC · JPL
191897	2005 AW_{55}	—	January 15, 2005	Socorro	LINEAR	·	7.1 km	MPC · JPL
191898	2005 AJ_{79}	—	January 15, 2005	Kitt Peak	Spacewatch	KOR	2.0 km	MPC · JPL
191899	2005 BP_{1}	—	January 17, 2005	Kleť	Kleť	EOS	3.3 km	MPC · JPL
191900	2005 BX_{6}	—	January 16, 2005	Socorro	LINEAR	(5)	2.7 km	MPC · JPL

== 191901–192000 ==
back to top

Designation			Discovery			Properties		Ref
Permanent	Provisional	Named after	Date	Site	Discoverer(s)	Category	Diam.	Ref
191901	2005 BK_{20}	—	January 16, 2005	Socorro	LINEAR	·	6.0 km	MPC · JPL
191902	2005 BU_{45}	—	January 16, 2005	Mauna Kea	Veillet, C.	·	5.4 km	MPC · JPL
191903	2005 CE_{27}	—	February 2, 2005	Kitt Peak	Spacewatch	·	5.9 km	MPC · JPL
191904	2005 CU_{37}	—	February 4, 2005	RAS	Mayhill	CYB	5.9 km	MPC · JPL
191905	2005 CF_{57}	—	February 2, 2005	Socorro	LINEAR	THM	3.5 km	MPC · JPL
191906	2005 EY_{35}	—	March 4, 2005	Catalina	CSS	·	5.2 km	MPC · JPL
191907	2005 EN_{115}	—	March 4, 2005	Socorro	LINEAR	·	3.0 km	MPC · JPL
191908	2005 EX_{121}	—	March 8, 2005	Socorro	LINEAR	NYS	1.5 km	MPC · JPL
191909	2005 EV_{142}	—	March 10, 2005	Catalina	CSS	·	2.6 km	MPC · JPL
191910 Elizawilliams	2005 EO_{258}	Elizawilliams	March 11, 2005	Mount Lemmon	Mount Lemmon Survey	·	4.8 km	MPC · JPL
191911 Nilerodgers	2005 GG_{41}	Nilerodgers	April 5, 2005	Mount Lemmon	Mount Lemmon Survey	·	4.6 km	MPC · JPL
191912	2005 JL_{133}	—	May 14, 2005	Kitt Peak	Spacewatch	L4	10 km	MPC · JPL
191913	2005 LO_{25}	—	June 8, 2005	Kitt Peak	Spacewatch	L4	12 km	MPC · JPL
191914	2005 MT_{14}	—	June 29, 2005	Kitt Peak	Spacewatch	L4	10 km	MPC · JPL
191915	2005 MJ_{19}	—	June 29, 2005	Palomar	NEAT	L4	19 km	MPC · JPL
191916	2005 OJ_{2}	—	July 28, 2005	Reedy Creek	J. Broughton	H	1.0 km	MPC · JPL
191917	2005 QO_{71}	—	August 29, 2005	Socorro	LINEAR	·	970 m	MPC · JPL
191918	2005 QV_{73}	—	August 29, 2005	Anderson Mesa	LONEOS	·	1.2 km	MPC · JPL
191919	2005 QS_{157}	—	August 27, 2005	Anderson Mesa	LONEOS	H	1.2 km	MPC · JPL
191920	2005 SV_{29}	—	September 23, 2005	Kitt Peak	Spacewatch	·	910 m	MPC · JPL
191921	2005 SQ_{33}	—	September 23, 2005	Kitt Peak	Spacewatch	·	3.2 km	MPC · JPL
191922	2005 SB_{48}	—	September 24, 2005	Kitt Peak	Spacewatch	·	900 m	MPC · JPL
191923	2005 SU_{51}	—	September 24, 2005	Kitt Peak	Spacewatch	·	840 m	MPC · JPL
191924	2005 SG_{64}	—	September 26, 2005	Kitt Peak	Spacewatch	·	1.2 km	MPC · JPL
191925	2005 SS_{66}	—	September 27, 2005	Kitt Peak	Spacewatch	·	1.0 km	MPC · JPL
191926	2005 SA_{83}	—	September 24, 2005	Kitt Peak	Spacewatch	·	630 m	MPC · JPL
191927	2005 SV_{89}	—	September 24, 2005	Kitt Peak	Spacewatch	·	980 m	MPC · JPL
191928	2005 SR_{105}	—	September 25, 2005	Palomar	NEAT	·	1.2 km	MPC · JPL
191929	2005 SN_{217}	—	September 30, 2005	Palomar	NEAT	EOS	3.1 km	MPC · JPL
191930	2005 SC_{257}	—	September 22, 2005	Palomar	NEAT	·	1.1 km	MPC · JPL
191931	2005 TU_{99}	—	October 7, 2005	Socorro	LINEAR	·	1.2 km	MPC · JPL
191932	2005 TE_{104}	—	October 8, 2005	Socorro	LINEAR	·	1.3 km	MPC · JPL
191933	2005 TL_{105}	—	October 8, 2005	Socorro	LINEAR	·	1.1 km	MPC · JPL
191934	2005 TX_{107}	—	October 6, 2005	Mount Lemmon	Mount Lemmon Survey	·	860 m	MPC · JPL
191935	2005 UY_{2}	—	October 24, 2005	Palomar	NEAT	·	1.2 km	MPC · JPL
191936	2005 UM_{4}	—	October 23, 2005	RAS	Hutsebaut, R.	·	1.0 km	MPC · JPL
191937	2005 UD_{16}	—	October 22, 2005	Kitt Peak	Spacewatch	·	1.9 km	MPC · JPL
191938	2005 UA_{17}	—	October 22, 2005	Kitt Peak	Spacewatch	·	1.1 km	MPC · JPL
191939	2005 UV_{23}	—	October 23, 2005	Kitt Peak	Spacewatch	·	790 m	MPC · JPL
191940	2005 UV_{25}	—	October 23, 2005	Kitt Peak	Spacewatch	·	1.4 km	MPC · JPL
191941	2005 UE_{40}	—	October 24, 2005	Kitt Peak	Spacewatch	·	1.3 km	MPC · JPL
191942	2005 UH_{43}	—	October 22, 2005	Kitt Peak	Spacewatch	·	1.1 km	MPC · JPL
191943	2005 UM_{46}	—	October 22, 2005	Kitt Peak	Spacewatch	·	1.0 km	MPC · JPL
191944	2005 UG_{48}	—	October 22, 2005	Palomar	NEAT	·	1.3 km	MPC · JPL
191945	2005 UC_{72}	—	October 23, 2005	Catalina	CSS	·	1.1 km	MPC · JPL
191946	2005 UL_{86}	—	October 22, 2005	Kitt Peak	Spacewatch	·	2.4 km	MPC · JPL
191947	2005 UZ_{100}	—	October 22, 2005	Kitt Peak	Spacewatch	·	1.1 km	MPC · JPL
191948	2005 UL_{105}	—	October 22, 2005	Kitt Peak	Spacewatch	·	950 m	MPC · JPL
191949	2005 UW_{105}	—	October 22, 2005	Kitt Peak	Spacewatch	V	1.1 km	MPC · JPL
191950	2005 UY_{111}	—	October 22, 2005	Kitt Peak	Spacewatch	·	3.0 km	MPC · JPL
191951	2005 UG_{112}	—	October 22, 2005	Kitt Peak	Spacewatch	·	1.3 km	MPC · JPL
191952	2005 UF_{117}	—	October 23, 2005	Catalina	CSS	·	1.0 km	MPC · JPL
191953	2005 UJ_{123}	—	October 24, 2005	Kitt Peak	Spacewatch	·	990 m	MPC · JPL
191954	2005 UQ_{153}	—	October 26, 2005	Kitt Peak	Spacewatch	·	1.4 km	MPC · JPL
191955	2005 UB_{155}	—	October 26, 2005	Kitt Peak	Spacewatch	·	1.1 km	MPC · JPL
191956	2005 UG_{177}	—	October 24, 2005	Kitt Peak	Spacewatch	·	1.3 km	MPC · JPL
191957	2005 UP_{227}	—	October 25, 2005	Kitt Peak	Spacewatch	·	970 m	MPC · JPL
191958	2005 UY_{228}	—	October 25, 2005	Kitt Peak	Spacewatch	·	1.0 km	MPC · JPL
191959	2005 UL_{241}	—	October 25, 2005	Kitt Peak	Spacewatch	·	770 m	MPC · JPL
191960	2005 UY_{356}	—	October 31, 2005	Mount Lemmon	Mount Lemmon Survey	V	840 m	MPC · JPL
191961	2005 UV_{442}	—	October 30, 2005	Catalina	CSS	·	900 m	MPC · JPL
191962	2005 UJ_{483}	—	October 22, 2005	Catalina	CSS	·	1.0 km	MPC · JPL
191963	2005 VW_{3}	—	November 6, 2005	Socorro	LINEAR	·	930 m	MPC · JPL
191964	2005 VF_{7}	—	November 12, 2005	Socorro	LINEAR	·	1.4 km	MPC · JPL
191965	2005 VB_{15}	—	November 14, 2005	Socorro	LINEAR	PHO	2.2 km	MPC · JPL
191966	2005 VU_{17}	—	November 4, 2005	Mount Lemmon	Mount Lemmon Survey	·	1.1 km	MPC · JPL
191967	2005 VV_{33}	—	November 2, 2005	Mount Lemmon	Mount Lemmon Survey	·	2.4 km	MPC · JPL
191968	2005 VA_{43}	—	November 4, 2005	Kitt Peak	Spacewatch	·	1.2 km	MPC · JPL
191969	2005 VD_{61}	—	November 5, 2005	Catalina	CSS	·	760 m	MPC · JPL
191970	2005 WF_{3}	—	November 20, 2005	Anderson Mesa	LONEOS	·	880 m	MPC · JPL
191971	2005 WK_{14}	—	November 22, 2005	Kitt Peak	Spacewatch	·	1.6 km	MPC · JPL
191972	2005 WR_{18}	—	November 22, 2005	Kitt Peak	Spacewatch	MAS	990 m	MPC · JPL
191973	2005 WC_{20}	—	November 21, 2005	Kitt Peak	Spacewatch	·	1.4 km	MPC · JPL
191974	2005 WG_{31}	—	November 21, 2005	Kitt Peak	Spacewatch	·	1.2 km	MPC · JPL
191975	2005 WN_{32}	—	November 21, 2005	Kitt Peak	Spacewatch	·	1.2 km	MPC · JPL
191976	2005 WR_{57}	—	November 21, 2005	Great Shefford	Birtwhistle, P.	V	840 m	MPC · JPL
191977	2005 WW_{58}	—	November 30, 2005	Kitt Peak	Spacewatch	·	1.4 km	MPC · JPL
191978	2005 WB_{60}	—	November 21, 2005	Catalina	CSS	·	1.1 km	MPC · JPL
191979	2005 WZ_{62}	—	November 25, 2005	Catalina	CSS	·	1.0 km	MPC · JPL
191980	2005 WB_{67}	—	November 22, 2005	Kitt Peak	Spacewatch	·	1.2 km	MPC · JPL
191981	2005 WR_{71}	—	November 21, 2005	Catalina	CSS	(2076)	1.2 km	MPC · JPL
191982	2005 WV_{89}	—	November 26, 2005	Catalina	CSS	·	1.1 km	MPC · JPL
191983	2005 WV_{94}	—	November 26, 2005	Kitt Peak	Spacewatch	MAS	960 m	MPC · JPL
191984	2005 WQ_{107}	—	November 25, 2005	Mount Lemmon	Mount Lemmon Survey	·	4.1 km	MPC · JPL
191985	2005 WB_{111}	—	November 30, 2005	Kitt Peak	Spacewatch	MAS	1.1 km	MPC · JPL
191986	2005 WB_{140}	—	November 26, 2005	Mount Lemmon	Mount Lemmon Survey	·	1.6 km	MPC · JPL
191987	2005 WK_{144}	—	November 30, 2005	Palomar	NEAT	·	1.6 km	MPC · JPL
191988	2005 WK_{153}	—	November 29, 2005	Kitt Peak	Spacewatch	·	1.7 km	MPC · JPL
191989	2005 WS_{200}	—	November 26, 2005	Kitt Peak	Spacewatch	MAS	1.3 km	MPC · JPL
191990	2005 WZ_{208}	—	November 21, 2005	Kitt Peak	Spacewatch	·	1.3 km	MPC · JPL
191991	2005 XR_{1}	—	December 2, 2005	Socorro	LINEAR	·	1.3 km	MPC · JPL
191992	2005 XJ_{3}	—	December 1, 2005	Socorro	LINEAR	·	1.2 km	MPC · JPL
191993	2005 XX_{7}	—	December 1, 2005	Kitt Peak	Spacewatch	·	1.1 km	MPC · JPL
191994	2005 XV_{21}	—	December 2, 2005	Socorro	LINEAR	·	1.3 km	MPC · JPL
191995	2005 XG_{38}	—	December 4, 2005	Kitt Peak	Spacewatch	·	5.0 km	MPC · JPL
191996	2005 XM_{48}	—	December 2, 2005	Socorro	LINEAR	·	1.2 km	MPC · JPL
191997	2005 XK_{56}	—	December 5, 2005	Socorro	LINEAR	·	1.3 km	MPC · JPL
191998	2005 XB_{62}	—	December 5, 2005	Socorro	LINEAR	·	1.4 km	MPC · JPL
191999	2005 XG_{64}	—	December 6, 2005	Kitt Peak	Spacewatch	HYG	4.6 km	MPC · JPL
192000	2005 XW_{67}	—	December 5, 2005	Socorro	LINEAR	·	2.5 km	MPC · JPL

back to top

== See also ==
- Meanings of minor-planet names: 191001–192000
