= Meanings of minor-planet names: 190001–191000 =

As minor planet discoveries are confirmed, they are given a permanent number by the IAU's Minor Planet Center (MPC), and the discoverers can then submit names for them, following the IAU's naming conventions. The list below concerns those minor planets in the specified number-range that have received names, and explains the meanings of those names.

Official naming citations of newly named small Solar System bodies are approved and published in a bulletin by IAU's Working Group for Small Bodies Nomenclature (WGSBN). Before May 2021, citations were published in MPC's Minor Planet Circulars for many decades. Recent citations can also be found on the JPL Small-Body Database (SBDB). Until his death in 2016, German astronomer Lutz D. Schmadel compiled these citations into the Dictionary of Minor Planet Names (DMP) and regularly updated the collection.

Based on Paul Herget's The Names of the Minor Planets, Schmadel also researched the unclear origin of numerous asteroids, most of which had been named prior to World War II. This article incorporates text from this source, which is in the public domain: SBDB New namings may only be added to this list below after official publication as the preannouncement of names is condemned. The WGSBN publishes a comprehensive guideline for the naming rules of non-cometary small Solar System bodies.

== 190001–190100 ==
Named minor planet	Provisional	This minor planet was named for...	Ref · Catalog
190026 Iskorosten	2004 QJ	Iskorosten was the capital of the Drevlyany tribe in the times of Kiev Rus	JPL · 190026
190057 Nakagawa	2004 RR_{252}	Nakagawa River (Naka River), named after the former Japanese city of Nakagawa, originates in the Turugi mountain range and flows for about 125 km in Tokushima prefecture	JPL · 190057

== 190101–190200 ==
back to top

Named minor planet	Provisional	This minor planet was named for...	Ref · Catalog
190139 Hansküng	2005 RV_{32}	Hans Küng (born 1928) is a Swiss theologian and essayist, and professor emeritus of theology at the Ecumenical University of Tübingen.	JPL · 190139

== 190201–190300 ==
back to top

Named minor planet	Provisional	This minor planet was named for...	Ref · Catalog
190283 Schielicke	1991 RE_{3}	Reinhard E. Schielicke (born 1940) is a German engineer who worked in astronomy as an associate of the University Observatory of Jena.	JPL · 190283

== 190301–190400 ==
back to top

Named minor planet	Provisional	This minor planet was named for...	Ref · Catalog
190310 De Martin	1997 TW	Davide De Martin (born 1971), Italian amateur astronomer, author and popularizer of astronomy	JPL · 190310
190333 Jirous	1998 SX_{14}	Ivan Martin Jirous (1944–2011), Czech poet, art historian, frontman of the rock group The Plastic People of the Universe	JPL · 190333

== 190401–190500 ==
back to top

Named minor planet	Provisional	This minor planet was named for...	Ref · Catalog
There are no named minor planets in this number range

== 190501–190600 ==
back to top

Named minor planet	Provisional	This minor planet was named for...	Ref · Catalog
190504 Hermanottó	2000 HE	Ottó Herman (1835–1914), a Hungarian zoologist, ethnographer, mineralogist, archaeologist, journalist, renowned as the "last polyhistor of Hungary".	JPL · 190504

== 190601–190700 ==
back to top

Named minor planet	Provisional	This minor planet was named for...	Ref · Catalog
190617 Alexandergerst	2000 WT_{9}	Geophysicist Alexander Gerst (born 1976) was the third German astronaut on board the International Space Station.	JPL · 190617

== 190701–190800 ==
back to top

Named minor planet	Provisional	This minor planet was named for...	Ref · Catalog
190710 Marktapley	2001 FA_{185}	Mark B. Tapley (born 1962) is an Institute Engineer at Southwest Research Institute, who served as the Payload Systems Engineer for the New Horizons Mission to Pluto.	JPL · 190710
190730 Lorenzonesi	2001 PY_{13}	Lorenzo Nesi (born 1966), Italian amateur astronomer.	JPL · 190730

== 190801–190900 ==
back to top

Named minor planet	Provisional	This minor planet was named for...	Ref · Catalog
There are no named minor planets in this number range

== 190901–191000 ==
back to top

Named minor planet	Provisional	This minor planet was named for...	Ref · Catalog
There are no named minor planets in this number range

back to top

Preceded by 189,001–190,000	Meanings of minor-planet names List of minor planets: 190,001–191,000	Succeeded by 191,001–192,000
