= List of minor planets: 190001–191000 =

The following is a partial list of minor planets, running from minor-planet number 190001 through 191000, inclusive. The primary data for this and other partial lists is based on JPL's "Small-Body Orbital Elements" and data available from the Minor Planet Center. Critical list information is also provided by the MPC, unless otherwise specified from Lowell Observatory. A detailed description of the table's columns and additional sources are given on the main page including a complete list of every page in this series, and a statistical break-up on the dynamical classification of minor planets.

Also see the summary list of all named bodies in numerical and alphabetical order, and the corresponding naming citations for the number range of this particular list. New namings may only be added to this list after official publication, as the preannouncement of names is condemned by the Working Group for Small Bodies Nomenclature of the International Astronomical Union.

Near-Earth obj.	MBA (inner)	MBA (outer)	Centaur
Mars-crosser	MBA (middle)	Jupiter trojan	Trans-Neptunian obj.
Unclassified

== 190001–190100 ==
Designation			Discovery			Properties		Ref
Permanent	Provisional	Named after	Date	Site	Discoverer(s)	Category	Diam.	Ref
190001	2004 HL_{45}	—	April 21, 2004	Socorro	LINEAR	·	1.2 km	MPC · JPL
190002	2004 JP_{14}	—	May 9, 2004	Kitt Peak	Spacewatch	·	1.7 km	MPC · JPL
190003	2004 JR_{26}	—	May 15, 2004	Socorro	LINEAR	·	1.8 km	MPC · JPL
190004	2004 KM_{6}	—	May 18, 2004	Socorro	LINEAR	NYS	1.5 km	MPC · JPL
190005	2004 KQ_{17}	—	May 19, 2004	Kitt Peak	Spacewatch	L4	14 km	MPC · JPL
190006	2004 LL_{11}	—	June 11, 2004	Palomar	NEAT	·	1.8 km	MPC · JPL
190007	2004 LM_{13}	—	June 11, 2004	Socorro	LINEAR	NYS ·	1.8 km	MPC · JPL
190008	2004 LT_{13}	—	June 11, 2004	Socorro	LINEAR	·	1.7 km	MPC · JPL
190009	2004 LV_{18}	—	June 11, 2004	Socorro	LINEAR	·	2.1 km	MPC · JPL
190010	2004 MM_{7}	—	June 27, 2004	Reedy Creek	J. Broughton	·	2.1 km	MPC · JPL
190011	2004 NR_{1}	—	July 9, 2004	Socorro	LINEAR	PHO	1.8 km	MPC · JPL
190012	2004 NV_{4}	—	July 9, 2004	Palomar	NEAT	·	2.4 km	MPC · JPL
190013	2004 NW_{12}	—	July 11, 2004	Socorro	LINEAR	·	2.2 km	MPC · JPL
190014	2004 NH_{22}	—	July 11, 2004	Socorro	LINEAR	·	2.7 km	MPC · JPL
190015	2004 NA_{27}	—	July 11, 2004	Socorro	LINEAR	·	1.5 km	MPC · JPL
190016	2004 OT_{9}	—	July 20, 2004	Reedy Creek	J. Broughton	·	2.1 km	MPC · JPL
190017	2004 PY_{15}	—	August 7, 2004	Palomar	NEAT	·	1.9 km	MPC · JPL
190018	2004 PU_{16}	—	August 7, 2004	Campo Imperatore	CINEOS	·	4.4 km	MPC · JPL
190019	2004 PW_{35}	—	August 8, 2004	Anderson Mesa	LONEOS	·	2.4 km	MPC · JPL
190020	2004 PY_{55}	—	August 8, 2004	Anderson Mesa	LONEOS	·	1.7 km	MPC · JPL
190021	2004 PZ_{55}	—	August 8, 2004	Anderson Mesa	LONEOS	·	3.8 km	MPC · JPL
190022	2004 PX_{58}	—	August 9, 2004	Socorro	LINEAR	(5)	1.3 km	MPC · JPL
190023	2004 PP_{83}	—	August 10, 2004	Socorro	LINEAR	·	3.2 km	MPC · JPL
190024	2004 PB_{102}	—	August 11, 2004	Palomar	NEAT	·	3.3 km	MPC · JPL
190025	2004 PO_{103}	—	August 12, 2004	Socorro	LINEAR	·	3.4 km	MPC · JPL
190026 Iskorosten	2004 QJ	Iskorosten	August 16, 2004	Andrushivka	Andrushivka	·	2.8 km	MPC · JPL
190027	2004 QB_{13}	—	August 21, 2004	Siding Spring	SSS	MAR	1.9 km	MPC · JPL
190028	2004 QG_{14}	—	August 19, 2004	Socorro	LINEAR	·	1.7 km	MPC · JPL
190029	2004 QE_{17}	—	August 25, 2004	Socorro	LINEAR	BAR	2.3 km	MPC · JPL
190030	2004 RC_{1}	—	September 3, 2004	Palomar	NEAT	·	1.7 km	MPC · JPL
190031	2004 RW_{17}	—	September 7, 2004	Kitt Peak	Spacewatch	·	3.0 km	MPC · JPL
190032	2004 RG_{41}	—	September 7, 2004	Kitt Peak	Spacewatch	·	5.0 km	MPC · JPL
190033	2004 RM_{54}	—	September 8, 2004	Socorro	LINEAR	MAR	2.0 km	MPC · JPL
190034	2004 RZ_{61}	—	September 8, 2004	Socorro	LINEAR	·	1.5 km	MPC · JPL
190035	2004 RY_{63}	—	September 8, 2004	Socorro	LINEAR	·	1.8 km	MPC · JPL
190036	2004 RM_{75}	—	September 8, 2004	Socorro	LINEAR	·	2.5 km	MPC · JPL
190037	2004 RF_{78}	—	September 8, 2004	Socorro	LINEAR	·	4.5 km	MPC · JPL
190038	2004 RK_{88}	—	September 7, 2004	Palomar	NEAT	·	2.6 km	MPC · JPL
190039	2004 RR_{88}	—	September 8, 2004	Socorro	LINEAR	·	1.4 km	MPC · JPL
190040	2004 RY_{103}	—	September 8, 2004	Palomar	NEAT	WIT	1.8 km	MPC · JPL
190041	2004 RO_{106}	—	September 8, 2004	Palomar	NEAT	·	3.2 km	MPC · JPL
190042	2004 RW_{112}	—	September 6, 2004	Socorro	LINEAR	·	3.3 km	MPC · JPL
190043	2004 RY_{112}	—	September 6, 2004	Socorro	LINEAR	·	3.5 km	MPC · JPL
190044	2004 RB_{113}	—	September 6, 2004	Socorro	LINEAR	JUN	2.0 km	MPC · JPL
190045	2004 RC_{124}	—	September 7, 2004	Palomar	NEAT	EUN	1.7 km	MPC · JPL
190046	2004 RZ_{150}	—	September 9, 2004	Socorro	LINEAR	·	2.4 km	MPC · JPL
190047	2004 RH_{152}	—	September 10, 2004	Socorro	LINEAR	MAR	1.6 km	MPC · JPL
190048	2004 RU_{159}	—	September 10, 2004	Socorro	LINEAR	·	4.5 km	MPC · JPL
190049	2004 RJ_{168}	—	September 8, 2004	Socorro	LINEAR	·	1.1 km	MPC · JPL
190050	2004 RF_{171}	—	September 9, 2004	Socorro	LINEAR	(5)	1.6 km	MPC · JPL
190051	2004 RL_{174}	—	September 10, 2004	Socorro	LINEAR	EUN	2.0 km	MPC · JPL
190052	2004 RP_{181}	—	September 10, 2004	Socorro	LINEAR	·	2.8 km	MPC · JPL
190053	2004 RH_{182}	—	September 10, 2004	Socorro	LINEAR	·	1.9 km	MPC · JPL
190054	2004 RO_{200}	—	September 10, 2004	Socorro	LINEAR	·	2.1 km	MPC · JPL
190055	2004 RK_{220}	—	September 11, 2004	Socorro	LINEAR	·	2.9 km	MPC · JPL
190056	2004 RQ_{249}	—	September 13, 2004	Kitt Peak	Spacewatch	·	2.0 km	MPC · JPL
190057 Nakagawa	2004 RR_{252}	Nakagawa	September 14, 2004	Nakagawa	Hori, H., Maeno, H.	·	2.6 km	MPC · JPL
190058	2004 RS_{257}	—	September 9, 2004	Anderson Mesa	LONEOS	·	2.2 km	MPC · JPL
190059	2004 RW_{306}	—	September 12, 2004	Socorro	LINEAR	·	2.5 km	MPC · JPL
190060	2004 RA_{307}	—	September 12, 2004	Socorro	LINEAR	·	3.2 km	MPC · JPL
190061	2004 RP_{314}	—	September 15, 2004	Kitt Peak	Spacewatch	·	2.2 km	MPC · JPL
190062	2004 RZ_{315}	—	September 9, 2004	Socorro	LINEAR	·	2.9 km	MPC · JPL
190063	2004 RS_{318}	—	September 12, 2004	Kitt Peak	Spacewatch	·	2.9 km	MPC · JPL
190064	2004 RU_{320}	—	September 13, 2004	Socorro	LINEAR	·	3.3 km	MPC · JPL
190065	2004 RY_{320}	—	September 13, 2004	Socorro	LINEAR	·	3.5 km	MPC · JPL
190066	2004 RV_{322}	—	September 13, 2004	Socorro	LINEAR	·	2.3 km	MPC · JPL
190067	2004 RX_{327}	—	September 14, 2004	Socorro	LINEAR	EUN	2.2 km	MPC · JPL
190068	2004 RR_{332}	—	September 14, 2004	Palomar	NEAT	·	3.1 km	MPC · JPL
190069	2004 RU_{332}	—	September 14, 2004	Palomar	NEAT	·	3.9 km	MPC · JPL
190070	2004 RL_{346}	—	September 9, 2004	Socorro	LINEAR	·	2.0 km	MPC · JPL
190071	2004 SU_{16}	—	September 17, 2004	Anderson Mesa	LONEOS	·	2.9 km	MPC · JPL
190072	2004 SW_{22}	—	September 17, 2004	Kitt Peak	Spacewatch	(12739)	2.4 km	MPC · JPL
190073	2004 SY_{44}	—	September 18, 2004	Socorro	LINEAR	·	2.8 km	MPC · JPL
190074	2004 SO_{45}	—	September 18, 2004	Socorro	LINEAR	ADE	4.1 km	MPC · JPL
190075	2004 SP_{56}	—	September 16, 2004	Anderson Mesa	LONEOS	·	1.7 km	MPC · JPL
190076	2004 SK_{58}	—	September 16, 2004	Anderson Mesa	LONEOS	·	2.6 km	MPC · JPL
190077	2004 TL_{11}	—	October 4, 2004	Goodricke-Pigott	R. A. Tucker	·	2.6 km	MPC · JPL
190078	2004 TL_{17}	—	October 10, 2004	Socorro	LINEAR	·	2.9 km	MPC · JPL
190079	2004 TL_{21}	—	October 3, 2004	Palomar	NEAT	·	3.4 km	MPC · JPL
190080	2004 TD_{38}	—	October 4, 2004	Kitt Peak	Spacewatch	·	2.1 km	MPC · JPL
190081	2004 TB_{50}	—	October 4, 2004	Kitt Peak	Spacewatch	AGN	1.9 km	MPC · JPL
190082	2004 TP_{51}	—	October 4, 2004	Kitt Peak	Spacewatch	MIS	3.3 km	MPC · JPL
190083	2004 TB_{79}	—	October 4, 2004	Anderson Mesa	LONEOS	EUN	2.2 km	MPC · JPL
190084	2004 TO_{83}	—	October 5, 2004	Kitt Peak	Spacewatch	·	2.8 km	MPC · JPL
190085	2004 TQ_{110}	—	October 7, 2004	Socorro	LINEAR	·	3.1 km	MPC · JPL
190086	2004 TW_{112}	—	October 7, 2004	Palomar	NEAT	·	3.5 km	MPC · JPL
190087	2004 TR_{132}	—	October 7, 2004	Socorro	LINEAR	·	3.9 km	MPC · JPL
190088	2004 TU_{133}	—	October 7, 2004	Palomar	NEAT	·	3.6 km	MPC · JPL
190089	2004 TM_{135}	—	October 8, 2004	Anderson Mesa	LONEOS	·	3.2 km	MPC · JPL
190090	2004 TN_{135}	—	October 8, 2004	Anderson Mesa	LONEOS	·	3.2 km	MPC · JPL
190091	2004 TU_{135}	—	October 8, 2004	Anderson Mesa	LONEOS	·	4.0 km	MPC · JPL
190092	2004 TO_{143}	—	October 4, 2004	Kitt Peak	Spacewatch	·	2.9 km	MPC · JPL
190093	2004 TH_{148}	—	October 6, 2004	Kitt Peak	Spacewatch	·	3.0 km	MPC · JPL
190094	2004 TL_{161}	—	October 6, 2004	Kitt Peak	Spacewatch	KOR	1.7 km	MPC · JPL
190095	2004 TR_{172}	—	October 8, 2004	Socorro	LINEAR	GEF	2.5 km	MPC · JPL
190096	2004 TY_{192}	—	October 7, 2004	Kitt Peak	Spacewatch	·	2.3 km	MPC · JPL
190097	2004 TY_{221}	—	October 7, 2004	Socorro	LINEAR	ADE	3.1 km	MPC · JPL
190098	2004 TF_{227}	—	October 8, 2004	Kitt Peak	Spacewatch	AGN	1.5 km	MPC · JPL
190099	2004 TA_{241}	—	October 10, 2004	Socorro	LINEAR	EUN	2.7 km	MPC · JPL
190100	2004 TS_{260}	—	October 9, 2004	Kitt Peak	Spacewatch	·	3.3 km	MPC · JPL

== 190101–190200 ==
back to top

Designation			Discovery			Properties		Ref
Permanent	Provisional	Named after	Date	Site	Discoverer(s)	Category	Diam.	Ref
190101	2004 TR_{264}	—	October 9, 2004	Kitt Peak	Spacewatch	KOR	2.2 km	MPC · JPL
190102	2004 TK_{268}	—	October 9, 2004	Kitt Peak	Spacewatch	GEF	1.7 km	MPC · JPL
190103	2004 TP_{285}	—	October 8, 2004	Socorro	LINEAR	EUN	2.1 km	MPC · JPL
190104	2004 TU_{287}	—	October 9, 2004	Socorro	LINEAR	JUN	2.2 km	MPC · JPL
190105	2004 TM_{290}	—	October 10, 2004	Kitt Peak	Spacewatch	·	2.0 km	MPC · JPL
190106	2004 TV_{308}	—	October 10, 2004	Socorro	LINEAR	DOR	4.2 km	MPC · JPL
190107	2004 TY_{333}	—	October 9, 2004	Kitt Peak	Spacewatch	EMA	4.0 km	MPC · JPL
190108	2004 TQ_{345}	—	October 14, 2004	Kitt Peak	Spacewatch	KOR	2.0 km	MPC · JPL
190109	2004 TX_{355}	—	October 7, 2004	Socorro	LINEAR	·	2.6 km	MPC · JPL
190110	2004 TD_{356}	—	October 10, 2004	Palomar	NEAT	·	2.7 km	MPC · JPL
190111	2004 TJ_{356}	—	October 14, 2004	Anderson Mesa	LONEOS	·	2.0 km	MPC · JPL
190112	2004 TV_{366}	—	October 10, 2004	Kitt Peak	Spacewatch	KOR	2.0 km	MPC · JPL
190113	2004 UX_{2}	—	October 18, 2004	Socorro	LINEAR	·	3.0 km	MPC · JPL
190114	2004 VH_{12}	—	November 3, 2004	Catalina	CSS	·	4.2 km	MPC · JPL
190115	2004 VY_{13}	—	November 4, 2004	Socorro	LINEAR	EUN	2.0 km	MPC · JPL
190116	2004 VU_{35}	—	November 3, 2004	Kitt Peak	Spacewatch	·	5.7 km	MPC · JPL
190117	2004 VB_{57}	—	November 5, 2004	Socorro	LINEAR	·	4.5 km	MPC · JPL
190118	2004 VR_{60}	—	November 10, 2004	Wrightwood	J. W. Young	·	4.4 km	MPC · JPL
190119	2004 VA_{64}	—	November 10, 2004	Socorro	LINEAR	T_{j} (2.65) · APO +1km	1.5 km	MPC · JPL
190120	2004 VS_{72}	—	November 9, 2004	Catalina	CSS	fast	4.6 km	MPC · JPL
190121	2004 WJ_{8}	—	November 19, 2004	Catalina	CSS	·	2.4 km	MPC · JPL
190122	2004 WZ_{9}	—	November 30, 2004	Palomar	NEAT	·	3.5 km	MPC · JPL
190123	2004 XQ_{6}	—	December 2, 2004	Socorro	LINEAR	·	2.6 km	MPC · JPL
190124	2004 XR_{16}	—	December 10, 2004	Pla D'Arguines	R. Ferrando	·	3.0 km	MPC · JPL
190125	2004 XZ_{177}	—	December 12, 2004	Kitt Peak	Spacewatch	·	4.8 km	MPC · JPL
190126	2004 XY_{190}	—	December 11, 2004	Campo Imperatore	CINEOS	KOR	2.2 km	MPC · JPL
190127	2004 YY_{2}	—	December 17, 2004	Socorro	LINEAR	EOS	4.0 km	MPC · JPL
190128	2004 YY_{30}	—	December 18, 2004	Socorro	LINEAR	·	3.4 km	MPC · JPL
190129	2005 CP_{4}	—	February 1, 2005	Kitt Peak	Spacewatch	·	3.9 km	MPC · JPL
190130	2005 CR_{25}	—	February 4, 2005	Antares	Astronomical Research Observatory	·	7.0 km	MPC · JPL
190131	2005 CJ_{60}	—	February 4, 2005	Socorro	LINEAR	·	7.7 km	MPC · JPL
190132	2005 JY_{1}	—	May 4, 2005	Catalina	CSS	H	810 m	MPC · JPL
190133	2005 LU_{35}	—	June 11, 2005	Kitt Peak	Spacewatch	EOS	2.8 km	MPC · JPL
190134	2005 NF_{60}	—	July 9, 2005	Kitt Peak	Spacewatch	·	1.5 km	MPC · JPL
190135	2005 QE_{30}	—	August 26, 2005	Palomar	NEAT	APO +1km	1.2 km	MPC · JPL
190136	2005 QW_{50}	—	August 26, 2005	Palomar	NEAT	·	900 m	MPC · JPL
190137	2005 QM_{157}	—	August 30, 2005	Palomar	NEAT	·	1.2 km	MPC · JPL
190138	2005 RW_{27}	—	September 10, 2005	Anderson Mesa	LONEOS	·	1.6 km	MPC · JPL
190139 Hansküng	2005 RV_{32}	Hansküng	September 14, 2005	Vallemare di Borbona	V. S. Casulli	·	840 m	MPC · JPL
190140	2005 ST_{26}	—	September 23, 2005	Kitt Peak	Spacewatch	·	960 m	MPC · JPL
190141	2005 SU_{63}	—	September 26, 2005	Kitt Peak	Spacewatch	·	1.1 km	MPC · JPL
190142	2005 SX_{109}	—	September 26, 2005	Kitt Peak	Spacewatch	V	930 m	MPC · JPL
190143	2005 SD_{130}	—	September 29, 2005	Anderson Mesa	LONEOS	·	930 m	MPC · JPL
190144	2005 SR_{151}	—	September 25, 2005	Kitt Peak	Spacewatch	·	1.2 km	MPC · JPL
190145	2005 SN_{164}	—	September 27, 2005	Palomar	NEAT	·	1.2 km	MPC · JPL
190146	2005 SH_{174}	—	September 29, 2005	Anderson Mesa	LONEOS	·	900 m	MPC · JPL
190147	2005 SA_{191}	—	September 29, 2005	Anderson Mesa	LONEOS	·	880 m	MPC · JPL
190148	2005 SS_{197}	—	September 30, 2005	Kitt Peak	Spacewatch	·	1.1 km	MPC · JPL
190149	2005 SU_{198}	—	September 30, 2005	Mount Lemmon	Mount Lemmon Survey	·	790 m	MPC · JPL
190150	2005 SM_{214}	—	September 30, 2005	Catalina	CSS	·	2.2 km	MPC · JPL
190151	2005 SR_{257}	—	September 18, 2005	Palomar	NEAT	·	1.1 km	MPC · JPL
190152	2005 TG_{28}	—	October 1, 2005	Anderson Mesa	LONEOS	·	1.3 km	MPC · JPL
190153	2005 TK_{45}	—	October 3, 2005	Catalina	CSS	·	910 m	MPC · JPL
190154	2005 TL_{83}	—	October 3, 2005	Socorro	LINEAR	·	1.0 km	MPC · JPL
190155	2005 TW_{103}	—	October 8, 2005	Socorro	LINEAR	·	1.1 km	MPC · JPL
190156	2005 TG_{105}	—	October 8, 2005	Catalina	CSS	V	860 m	MPC · JPL
190157	2005 TN_{106}	—	October 10, 2005	Kitt Peak	Spacewatch	·	1.3 km	MPC · JPL
190158	2005 TR_{153}	—	October 7, 2005	Socorro	LINEAR	V	990 m	MPC · JPL
190159	2005 TD_{173}	—	October 13, 2005	Socorro	LINEAR	·	1.1 km	MPC · JPL
190160	2005 TE_{173}	—	October 13, 2005	Socorro	LINEAR	·	1.2 km	MPC · JPL
190161	2005 TJ_{174}	—	October 7, 2005	Socorro	LINEAR	AMO +1km	3.0 km	MPC · JPL
190162	2005 UM_{45}	—	October 22, 2005	Catalina	CSS	·	1.0 km	MPC · JPL
190163	2005 UY_{54}	—	October 23, 2005	Catalina	CSS	·	1.2 km	MPC · JPL
190164	2005 UB_{60}	—	October 25, 2005	Anderson Mesa	LONEOS	·	1.3 km	MPC · JPL
190165	2005 US_{115}	—	October 23, 2005	Palomar	NEAT	·	920 m	MPC · JPL
190166	2005 UP_{156}	—	October 31, 2005	Kitt Peak	Spacewatch	AMO +1km · moon	1.0 km	MPC · JPL
190167	2005 UW_{158}	—	October 26, 2005	Gnosca	S. Sposetti	·	1.1 km	MPC · JPL
190168	2005 UE_{170}	—	October 24, 2005	Kitt Peak	Spacewatch	·	950 m	MPC · JPL
190169	2005 UD_{190}	—	October 27, 2005	Mount Lemmon	Mount Lemmon Survey	MAS	870 m	MPC · JPL
190170	2005 UT_{215}	—	October 25, 2005	Kitt Peak	Spacewatch	·	1.3 km	MPC · JPL
190171	2005 UA_{216}	—	October 25, 2005	Kitt Peak	Spacewatch	·	1.0 km	MPC · JPL
190172	2005 UQ_{230}	—	October 25, 2005	Catalina	CSS	·	2.0 km	MPC · JPL
190173	2005 UJ_{354}	—	October 29, 2005	Catalina	CSS	·	1.2 km	MPC · JPL
190174	2005 UA_{364}	—	October 27, 2005	Kitt Peak	Spacewatch	NYS	1.8 km	MPC · JPL
190175	2005 UR_{368}	—	October 27, 2005	Kitt Peak	Spacewatch	NYS	1.9 km	MPC · JPL
190176	2005 UM_{390}	—	October 29, 2005	Mount Lemmon	Mount Lemmon Survey	·	1.2 km	MPC · JPL
190177	2005 UQ_{397}	—	October 28, 2005	Catalina	CSS	·	1.1 km	MPC · JPL
190178	2005 UQ_{411}	—	October 31, 2005	Mount Lemmon	Mount Lemmon Survey	·	1.6 km	MPC · JPL
190179	2005 UT_{411}	—	October 31, 2005	Mount Lemmon	Mount Lemmon Survey	·	2.1 km	MPC · JPL
190180	2005 UC_{478}	—	October 27, 2005	Anderson Mesa	LONEOS	·	840 m	MPC · JPL
190181	2005 VM_{16}	—	November 3, 2005	Socorro	LINEAR	·	2.3 km	MPC · JPL
190182	2005 VZ_{42}	—	November 4, 2005	Kitt Peak	Spacewatch	·	1.2 km	MPC · JPL
190183	2005 VX_{73}	—	November 1, 2005	Mount Lemmon	Mount Lemmon Survey	(2076)	1.0 km	MPC · JPL
190184	2005 VT_{78}	—	November 6, 2005	Kitt Peak	Spacewatch	·	2.4 km	MPC · JPL
190185	2005 WO_{30}	—	November 21, 2005	Kitt Peak	Spacewatch	·	1.9 km	MPC · JPL
190186	2005 WM_{31}	—	November 21, 2005	Kitt Peak	Spacewatch	NYS	1.8 km	MPC · JPL
190187	2005 WB_{39}	—	November 25, 2005	Mount Lemmon	Mount Lemmon Survey	·	3.7 km	MPC · JPL
190188	2005 WF_{73}	—	November 25, 2005	Catalina	CSS	·	1.2 km	MPC · JPL
190189	2005 WA_{76}	—	November 25, 2005	Kitt Peak	Spacewatch	·	1.2 km	MPC · JPL
190190	2005 WD_{88}	—	November 28, 2005	Mount Lemmon	Mount Lemmon Survey	·	2.6 km	MPC · JPL
190191	2005 WG_{103}	—	November 26, 2005	Catalina	CSS	·	1.6 km	MPC · JPL
190192	2005 WJ_{147}	—	November 25, 2005	Catalina	CSS	·	920 m	MPC · JPL
190193	2005 WM_{158}	—	November 28, 2005	Socorro	LINEAR	·	1.0 km	MPC · JPL
190194	2005 WF_{178}	—	November 30, 2005	Kitt Peak	Spacewatch	·	3.6 km	MPC · JPL
190195	2005 WT_{179}	—	November 21, 2005	Catalina	CSS	·	1.3 km	MPC · JPL
190196	2005 XE_{27}	—	December 4, 2005	Kitt Peak	Spacewatch	NYS	2.3 km	MPC · JPL
190197	2005 XS_{29}	—	December 7, 2005	Socorro	LINEAR	·	2.5 km	MPC · JPL
190198	2005 XO_{84}	—	December 9, 2005	Socorro	LINEAR	·	4.4 km	MPC · JPL
190199	2005 YH_{111}	—	December 25, 2005	Kitt Peak	Spacewatch	·	3.5 km	MPC · JPL
190200	2005 YZ_{138}	—	December 27, 2005	Mount Lemmon	Mount Lemmon Survey	·	3.1 km	MPC · JPL

== 190201–190300 ==
back to top

Designation			Discovery			Properties		Ref
Permanent	Provisional	Named after	Date	Site	Discoverer(s)	Category	Diam.	Ref
190201	2005 YX_{145}	—	December 29, 2005	Socorro	LINEAR	EOS	3.4 km	MPC · JPL
190202	2005 YS_{155}	—	December 25, 2005	Anderson Mesa	LONEOS	·	2.9 km	MPC · JPL
190203	2005 YA_{158}	—	December 27, 2005	Kitt Peak	Spacewatch	·	2.4 km	MPC · JPL
190204	2005 YV_{163}	—	December 28, 2005	Palomar	NEAT	·	2.1 km	MPC · JPL
190205	2005 YP_{207}	—	December 28, 2005	Kitt Peak	Spacewatch	NYS	2.6 km	MPC · JPL
190206	2005 YC_{233}	—	December 28, 2005	Kitt Peak	Spacewatch	NEM	3.4 km	MPC · JPL
190207	2005 YF_{269}	—	December 25, 2005	Mount Lemmon	Mount Lemmon Survey	·	3.8 km	MPC · JPL
190208	2006 AQ	—	January 2, 2006	Mauna Kea	D. J. Tholen	AMO +1km · moon · slow	810 m	MPC · JPL
190209	2006 AA_{21}	—	January 5, 2006	Catalina	CSS	·	4.6 km	MPC · JPL
190210	2006 AS_{66}	—	January 9, 2006	Kitt Peak	Spacewatch	·	4.6 km	MPC · JPL
190211	2006 BY_{20}	—	January 22, 2006	Mount Lemmon	Mount Lemmon Survey	EOS	2.7 km	MPC · JPL
190212	2006 BY_{45}	—	January 23, 2006	Mount Lemmon	Mount Lemmon Survey	·	3.5 km	MPC · JPL
190213	2006 BL_{66}	—	January 23, 2006	Kitt Peak	Spacewatch	CYB	5.5 km	MPC · JPL
190214	2006 BQ_{90}	—	January 25, 2006	Kitt Peak	Spacewatch	LIX	6.6 km	MPC · JPL
190215	2006 BR_{92}	—	January 26, 2006	Mount Lemmon	Mount Lemmon Survey	·	3.2 km	MPC · JPL
190216	2006 BD_{114}	—	January 25, 2006	Kitt Peak	Spacewatch	·	5.2 km	MPC · JPL
190217	2006 BY_{209}	—	January 31, 2006	Kitt Peak	Spacewatch	·	4.9 km	MPC · JPL
190218	2006 BV_{223}	—	January 30, 2006	Kitt Peak	Spacewatch	KOR	1.9 km	MPC · JPL
190219	2006 CG_{53}	—	February 4, 2006	Kitt Peak	Spacewatch	·	4.4 km	MPC · JPL
190220	2006 CC_{54}	—	February 4, 2006	Catalina	CSS	·	3.8 km	MPC · JPL
190221	2006 DM_{12}	—	February 21, 2006	Mount Lemmon	Mount Lemmon Survey	·	3.7 km	MPC · JPL
190222	2006 DE_{34}	—	February 20, 2006	Kitt Peak	Spacewatch	·	2.3 km	MPC · JPL
190223	2006 DA_{35}	—	February 20, 2006	Kitt Peak	Spacewatch	·	4.5 km	MPC · JPL
190224	2006 DW_{66}	—	February 22, 2006	Anderson Mesa	LONEOS	TEL	3.1 km	MPC · JPL
190225	2006 DA_{82}	—	February 24, 2006	Kitt Peak	Spacewatch	KOR	2.3 km	MPC · JPL
190226	2006 DL_{120}	—	February 21, 2006	Catalina	CSS	EOS	3.4 km	MPC · JPL
190227	2006 DV_{201}	—	February 20, 2006	Socorro	LINEAR	·	7.7 km	MPC · JPL
190228	2006 EB_{10}	—	March 2, 2006	Kitt Peak	Spacewatch	·	4.0 km	MPC · JPL
190229	2006 OO_{5}	—	July 19, 2006	Palomar	NEAT	L4	18 km	MPC · JPL
190230	2006 TD_{104}	—	October 15, 2006	Kitt Peak	Spacewatch	·	2.9 km	MPC · JPL
190231	2006 UC_{143}	—	October 19, 2006	Kitt Peak	Spacewatch	·	1.6 km	MPC · JPL
190232	2006 VF_{54}	—	November 11, 2006	Kitt Peak	Spacewatch	V	830 m	MPC · JPL
190233	2007 AK_{2}	—	January 1, 2007	Palomar	NEAT	H	830 m	MPC · JPL
190234	2007 BW_{6}	—	January 17, 2007	Kitt Peak	Spacewatch	·	1.1 km	MPC · JPL
190235	2007 BL_{74}	—	January 17, 2007	Kitt Peak	Spacewatch	·	1.2 km	MPC · JPL
190236	2007 BF_{78}	—	January 27, 2007	Kitt Peak	Spacewatch	TEL	2.1 km	MPC · JPL
190237	2007 DM_{10}	—	February 17, 2007	Kitt Peak	Spacewatch	·	2.4 km	MPC · JPL
190238	2007 DL_{43}	—	February 17, 2007	Catalina	CSS	·	2.0 km	MPC · JPL
190239	2007 DT_{44}	—	February 17, 2007	Catalina	CSS	·	4.5 km	MPC · JPL
190240	2007 DP_{52}	—	February 19, 2007	Mount Lemmon	Mount Lemmon Survey	KRM	3.4 km	MPC · JPL
190241	2007 DS_{57}	—	February 21, 2007	Mount Lemmon	Mount Lemmon Survey	·	2.0 km	MPC · JPL
190242	2007 DA_{60}	—	February 21, 2007	Kitt Peak	Spacewatch	V	1.0 km	MPC · JPL
190243	2007 EJ_{36}	—	March 11, 2007	Anderson Mesa	LONEOS	·	5.7 km	MPC · JPL
190244	2007 EZ_{67}	—	March 10, 2007	Kitt Peak	Spacewatch	·	1.7 km	MPC · JPL
190245	2007 EW_{74}	—	March 10, 2007	Kitt Peak	Spacewatch	·	3.5 km	MPC · JPL
190246	2007 EN_{139}	—	March 12, 2007	Kitt Peak	Spacewatch	PHO	1.3 km	MPC · JPL
190247	2007 EG_{173}	—	March 14, 2007	Kitt Peak	Spacewatch	·	2.4 km	MPC · JPL
190248	2007 EJ_{182}	—	March 14, 2007	Kitt Peak	Spacewatch	·	4.7 km	MPC · JPL
190249	2007 ED_{200}	—	March 11, 2007	Kitt Peak	Spacewatch	GEF	1.8 km	MPC · JPL
190250	2007 EZ_{217}	—	March 9, 2007	Mount Lemmon	Mount Lemmon Survey	·	2.3 km	MPC · JPL
190251	2007 GL	—	April 7, 2007	Mount Lemmon	Mount Lemmon Survey	HYG	3.8 km	MPC · JPL
190252	2007 GA_{33}	—	April 11, 2007	Kitt Peak	Spacewatch	THM	3.8 km	MPC · JPL
190253	2007 GX_{33}	—	April 11, 2007	Siding Spring	SSS	(18466)	4.6 km	MPC · JPL
190254	2007 GR_{44}	—	April 14, 2007	Kitt Peak	Spacewatch	·	2.9 km	MPC · JPL
190255	2007 HG	—	April 16, 2007	7300 Observatory	W. K. Y. Yeung	·	3.8 km	MPC · JPL
190256	2007 HV_{32}	—	April 19, 2007	Kitt Peak	Spacewatch	·	4.0 km	MPC · JPL
190257	2007 HP_{40}	—	April 20, 2007	Kitt Peak	Spacewatch	·	6.6 km	MPC · JPL
190258	2007 HC_{67}	—	April 22, 2007	Mount Lemmon	Mount Lemmon Survey	·	2.6 km	MPC · JPL
190259	2007 JX_{6}	—	May 9, 2007	Mount Lemmon	Mount Lemmon Survey	·	5.1 km	MPC · JPL
190260	2007 JM_{12}	—	May 7, 2007	Catalina	CSS	KOR	2.4 km	MPC · JPL
190261	2007 JV_{44}	—	May 10, 2007	Mount Lemmon	Mount Lemmon Survey	·	3.9 km	MPC · JPL
190262	2007 LA_{37}	—	June 12, 2007	Kitt Peak	Spacewatch	·	6.8 km	MPC · JPL
190263	2007 MF_{4}	—	June 16, 2007	Kitt Peak	Spacewatch	EOS	3.6 km	MPC · JPL
190264	2007 NE_{2}	—	July 7, 2007	Marly	P. Kocher	L4	15 km	MPC · JPL
190265	2007 TC_{149}	—	October 8, 2007	Socorro	LINEAR	HOF	3.5 km	MPC · JPL
190266	2007 UU_{32}	—	October 19, 2007	Mount Lemmon	Mount Lemmon Survey	·	2.8 km	MPC · JPL
190267	2007 VL_{6}	—	November 3, 2007	Mount Lemmon	Mount Lemmon Survey	L4	10 km	MPC · JPL
190268	2007 XU_{3}	—	December 5, 2007	Catalina	CSS	L4	18 km	MPC · JPL
190269	2008 EL_{64}	—	March 9, 2008	Mount Lemmon	Mount Lemmon Survey	·	2.3 km	MPC · JPL
190270	2008 FM_{101}	—	March 30, 2008	Kitt Peak	Spacewatch	·	2.3 km	MPC · JPL
190271	2008 HG_{5}	—	April 24, 2008	Kitt Peak	Spacewatch	·	2.5 km	MPC · JPL
190272	2008 NO_{2}	—	July 9, 2008	OAM	OAM	·	3.7 km	MPC · JPL
190273	2822 P-L	—	September 24, 1960	Palomar	C. J. van Houten, I. van Houten-Groeneveld, T. Gehrels	·	1.1 km	MPC · JPL
190274	3117 P-L	—	September 24, 1960	Palomar	C. J. van Houten, I. van Houten-Groeneveld, T. Gehrels	·	830 m	MPC · JPL
190275	4275 P-L	—	September 24, 1960	Palomar	C. J. van Houten, I. van Houten-Groeneveld, T. Gehrels	·	1.7 km	MPC · JPL
190276	4548 P-L	—	September 24, 1960	Palomar	C. J. van Houten, I. van Houten-Groeneveld, T. Gehrels	·	1.1 km	MPC · JPL
190277	6227 P-L	—	September 24, 1960	Palomar	C. J. van Houten, I. van Houten-Groeneveld, T. Gehrels	·	1.9 km	MPC · JPL
190278	2217 T-2	—	September 29, 1973	Palomar	C. J. van Houten, I. van Houten-Groeneveld, T. Gehrels	·	2.1 km	MPC · JPL
190279	5143 T-2	—	September 25, 1973	Palomar	C. J. van Houten, I. van Houten-Groeneveld, T. Gehrels	·	1.1 km	MPC · JPL
190280	2142 T-3	—	October 16, 1977	Palomar	C. J. van Houten, I. van Houten-Groeneveld, T. Gehrels	·	2.5 km	MPC · JPL
190281	3525 T-3	—	October 16, 1977	Palomar	C. J. van Houten, I. van Houten-Groeneveld, T. Gehrels	·	2.5 km	MPC · JPL
190282	1989 UQ_{3}	—	October 26, 1989	Palomar	E. F. Helin	·	2.2 km	MPC · JPL
190283 Schielicke	1991 RE_{3}	Schielicke	September 12, 1991	Tautenburg Observatory	F. Börngen, L. D. Schmadel	·	1.2 km	MPC · JPL
190284	1991 TN_{16}	—	October 6, 1991	Palomar	Lowe, A.	·	890 m	MPC · JPL
190285	1993 FH_{8}	—	March 17, 1993	La Silla	UESAC	·	3.9 km	MPC · JPL
190286	1993 FV_{9}	—	March 17, 1993	La Silla	UESAC	·	2.0 km	MPC · JPL
190287	1993 FR_{54}	—	March 17, 1993	La Silla	UESAC	WIT	1.9 km	MPC · JPL
190288	1994 PG_{12}	—	August 10, 1994	La Silla	E. W. Elst	(2076)	1.5 km	MPC · JPL
190289	1994 PR_{15}	—	August 10, 1994	La Silla	E. W. Elst	DOR	3.5 km	MPC · JPL
190290	1994 SZ	—	September 27, 1994	Kitt Peak	Spacewatch	·	3.2 km	MPC · JPL
190291	1995 OD_{6}	—	July 22, 1995	Kitt Peak	Spacewatch	·	750 m	MPC · JPL
190292	1995 OO_{7}	—	July 24, 1995	Kitt Peak	Spacewatch	(1547)	3.1 km	MPC · JPL
190293	1995 OU_{10}	—	July 22, 1995	Kitt Peak	Spacewatch	EUN	1.9 km	MPC · JPL
190294	1995 QC_{6}	—	August 22, 1995	Kitt Peak	Spacewatch	L4	12 km	MPC · JPL
190295	1995 SQ_{27}	—	September 19, 1995	Kitt Peak	Spacewatch	·	1.1 km	MPC · JPL
190296	1995 SG_{46}	—	September 26, 1995	Kitt Peak	Spacewatch	·	930 m	MPC · JPL
190297	1995 UL_{43}	—	October 24, 1995	Kitt Peak	Spacewatch	MRX	1.9 km	MPC · JPL
190298	1995 WW_{33}	—	November 20, 1995	Kitt Peak	Spacewatch	·	860 m	MPC · JPL
190299	1996 AK_{3}	—	January 13, 1996	Kiso	Kiso	GEF	2.1 km	MPC · JPL
190300	1996 RV	—	September 10, 1996	Haleakala	NEAT	·	3.2 km	MPC · JPL

== 190301–190400 ==
back to top

Designation			Discovery			Properties		Ref
Permanent	Provisional	Named after	Date	Site	Discoverer(s)	Category	Diam.	Ref
190301	1996 RA_{14}	—	September 8, 1996	Kitt Peak	Spacewatch	L4	10 km	MPC · JPL
190302	1996 XE_{21}	—	December 7, 1996	Kitt Peak	Spacewatch	·	2.3 km	MPC · JPL
190303	1997 AH_{10}	—	January 9, 1997	Kitt Peak	Spacewatch	·	2.0 km	MPC · JPL
190304	1997 EP_{4}	—	March 2, 1997	Kitt Peak	Spacewatch	AST	3.7 km	MPC · JPL
190305	1997 LJ_{1}	—	June 1, 1997	Kitt Peak	Spacewatch	·	2.9 km	MPC · JPL
190306	1997 MB_{6}	—	June 26, 1997	Kitt Peak	Spacewatch	EOS	4.0 km	MPC · JPL
190307	1997 RA_{13}	—	September 6, 1997	Caussols	ODAS	HYG	3.8 km	MPC · JPL
190308	1997 SZ_{5}	—	September 23, 1997	Kitt Peak	Spacewatch	THM	2.9 km	MPC · JPL
190309	1997 SX_{13}	—	September 28, 1997	Kitt Peak	Spacewatch	L4	14 km	MPC · JPL
190310 De Martin	1997 TW	De Martin	October 2, 1997	Sormano	Giuliani, V.	·	6.4 km	MPC · JPL
190311	1997 TM_{2}	—	October 3, 1997	Caussols	ODAS	L4	14 km	MPC · JPL
190312	1997 TK_{27}	—	October 3, 1997	Caussols	ODAS	CLA · fast	2.5 km	MPC · JPL
190313	1997 UP_{12}	—	October 23, 1997	Kitt Peak	Spacewatch	MAS	1.2 km	MPC · JPL
190314	1997 VU_{1}	—	November 1, 1997	Ondřejov	P. Pravec, L. Kotková	·	5.0 km	MPC · JPL
190315	1997 VY_{4}	—	November 5, 1997	Nachi-Katsuura	Y. Shimizu, T. Urata	PHO	3.8 km	MPC · JPL
190316	1997 WC_{22}	—	November 28, 1997	Xinglong	SCAP	·	6.0 km	MPC · JPL
190317	1997 XU_{13}	—	December 4, 1997	La Silla	Uppsala-DLR Trojan Survey	·	1.5 km	MPC · JPL
190318	1998 DN_{24}	—	February 22, 1998	Kitt Peak	Spacewatch	·	1.9 km	MPC · JPL
190319	1998 FN_{29}	—	March 20, 1998	Socorro	LINEAR	·	2.0 km	MPC · JPL
190320	1998 HD_{33}	—	April 20, 1998	Socorro	LINEAR	·	3.5 km	MPC · JPL
190321	1998 HH_{42}	—	April 24, 1998	Kitt Peak	Spacewatch	(5)	2.1 km	MPC · JPL
190322	1998 HZ_{83}	—	April 21, 1998	Socorro	LINEAR	·	3.4 km	MPC · JPL
190323	1998 KR_{5}	—	May 19, 1998	Kitt Peak	Spacewatch	DOR	3.9 km	MPC · JPL
190324	1998 OC_{13}	—	July 26, 1998	La Silla	E. W. Elst	·	860 m	MPC · JPL
190325	1998 QQ_{60}	—	August 27, 1998	Ondřejov	L. Kotková	·	3.3 km	MPC · JPL
190326	1998 QD_{69}	—	August 24, 1998	Socorro	LINEAR	·	1.2 km	MPC · JPL
190327	1998 QE_{85}	—	August 24, 1998	Socorro	LINEAR	·	1.3 km	MPC · JPL
190328	1998 RA_{12}	—	September 13, 1998	Kitt Peak	Spacewatch	·	1.1 km	MPC · JPL
190329	1998 RK_{14}	—	September 14, 1998	Kitt Peak	Spacewatch	KOR	1.9 km	MPC · JPL
190330	1998 RO_{25}	—	September 14, 1998	Socorro	LINEAR	·	1.0 km	MPC · JPL
190331	1998 RL_{41}	—	September 14, 1998	Socorro	LINEAR	·	1.4 km	MPC · JPL
190332	1998 RC_{60}	—	September 14, 1998	Socorro	LINEAR	·	1.2 km	MPC · JPL
190333 Jirous	1998 SX_{14}	Jirous	September 23, 1998	Kleť	M. Tichý	·	4.7 km	MPC · JPL
190334	1998 SM_{59}	—	September 17, 1998	Anderson Mesa	LONEOS	·	1.0 km	MPC · JPL
190335	1998 SJ_{76}	—	September 19, 1998	Socorro	LINEAR	·	2.7 km	MPC · JPL
190336	1998 SD_{83}	—	September 26, 1998	Socorro	LINEAR	·	960 m	MPC · JPL
190337	1998 SS_{96}	—	September 26, 1998	Socorro	LINEAR	EOS	3.8 km	MPC · JPL
190338	1998 SZ_{108}	—	September 26, 1998	Socorro	LINEAR	·	1.4 km	MPC · JPL
190339	1998 SC_{117}	—	September 26, 1998	Socorro	LINEAR	·	1.1 km	MPC · JPL
190340	1998 SX_{168}	—	September 18, 1998	Anderson Mesa	LONEOS	·	1.0 km	MPC · JPL
190341	1998 TS_{15}	—	October 15, 1998	Caussols	ODAS	·	2.6 km	MPC · JPL
190342	1998 TJ_{20}	—	October 13, 1998	Kitt Peak	Spacewatch	·	1.2 km	MPC · JPL
190343	1998 TZ_{24}	—	October 14, 1998	Kitt Peak	Spacewatch	EOS ·	4.9 km	MPC · JPL
190344	1998 TO_{29}	—	October 15, 1998	Kitt Peak	Spacewatch	EOS ·	5.6 km	MPC · JPL
190345	1998 UR_{14}	—	October 23, 1998	Kitt Peak	Spacewatch	·	1.2 km	MPC · JPL
190346	1998 UG_{33}	—	October 28, 1998	Socorro	LINEAR	·	1.5 km	MPC · JPL
190347	1998 VD_{19}	—	November 10, 1998	Socorro	LINEAR	EMA	6.2 km	MPC · JPL
190348	1998 VE_{28}	—	November 10, 1998	Socorro	LINEAR	·	5.9 km	MPC · JPL
190349	1998 WL_{7}	—	November 23, 1998	Socorro	LINEAR	·	2.8 km	MPC · JPL
190350	1998 WD_{28}	—	November 18, 1998	Kitt Peak	Spacewatch	·	1.6 km	MPC · JPL
190351	1998 XV_{1}	—	December 7, 1998	Caussols	ODAS	L4	11 km	MPC · JPL
190352	1998 XC_{23}	—	December 11, 1998	Kitt Peak	Spacewatch	L4	10 km	MPC · JPL
190353	1998 XK_{99}	—	December 15, 1998	Caussols	ODAS	L4	13 km	MPC · JPL
190354	1998 YC_{20}	—	December 25, 1998	Kitt Peak	Spacewatch	THM	3.3 km	MPC · JPL
190355	1999 AR_{6}	—	January 9, 1999	Farra d'Isonzo	Farra d'Isonzo	·	1.4 km	MPC · JPL
190356	1999 BY_{28}	—	January 18, 1999	Kitt Peak	Spacewatch	·	1.5 km	MPC · JPL
190357	1999 CG_{11}	—	February 12, 1999	Socorro	LINEAR	T_{j} (2.99) · EUP	6.4 km	MPC · JPL
190358	1999 CC_{147}	—	February 9, 1999	Kitt Peak	Spacewatch	VER	4.2 km	MPC · JPL
190359	1999 FJ_{3}	—	March 19, 1999	Socorro	LINEAR	PHO	2.0 km	MPC · JPL
190360	1999 FL_{70}	—	March 20, 1999	Apache Point	SDSS	·	2.3 km	MPC · JPL
190361	1999 FM_{82}	—	March 20, 1999	Apache Point	SDSS	·	1.7 km	MPC · JPL
190362	1999 JX_{99}	—	May 12, 1999	Socorro	LINEAR	BRG	3.1 km	MPC · JPL
190363	1999 JL_{134}	—	May 15, 1999	Catalina	CSS	EUN	1.9 km	MPC · JPL
190364	1999 LJ_{4}	—	June 10, 1999	Socorro	LINEAR	BAR	2.4 km	MPC · JPL
190365	1999 RS_{23}	—	September 7, 1999	Socorro	LINEAR	·	3.3 km	MPC · JPL
190366	1999 RW_{39}	—	September 12, 1999	Catalina	CSS	·	2.9 km	MPC · JPL
190367	1999 RE_{54}	—	September 7, 1999	Socorro	LINEAR	ADE	3.8 km	MPC · JPL
190368	1999 RR_{56}	—	September 11, 1999	Socorro	LINEAR	·	2.8 km	MPC · JPL
190369	1999 RT_{72}	—	September 7, 1999	Socorro	LINEAR	·	3.2 km	MPC · JPL
190370	1999 RZ_{78}	—	September 7, 1999	Socorro	LINEAR	·	4.3 km	MPC · JPL
190371	1999 RX_{81}	—	September 7, 1999	Socorro	LINEAR	·	3.9 km	MPC · JPL
190372	1999 RW_{82}	—	September 7, 1999	Socorro	LINEAR	·	3.0 km	MPC · JPL
190373	1999 RY_{84}	—	September 7, 1999	Socorro	LINEAR	(13314)	4.0 km	MPC · JPL
190374	1999 RG_{86}	—	September 7, 1999	Socorro	LINEAR	·	3.4 km	MPC · JPL
190375	1999 RY_{98}	—	September 7, 1999	Socorro	LINEAR	·	3.9 km	MPC · JPL
190376	1999 RE_{104}	—	September 8, 1999	Socorro	LINEAR	EUN	2.5 km	MPC · JPL
190377	1999 RE_{107}	—	September 8, 1999	Socorro	LINEAR	GEF	1.9 km	MPC · JPL
190378	1999 RN_{108}	—	September 8, 1999	Socorro	LINEAR	·	3.2 km	MPC · JPL
190379	1999 RQ_{123}	—	September 9, 1999	Socorro	LINEAR	·	5.4 km	MPC · JPL
190380	1999 RS_{123}	—	September 9, 1999	Socorro	LINEAR	·	2.9 km	MPC · JPL
190381	1999 RJ_{132}	—	September 9, 1999	Socorro	LINEAR	·	3.5 km	MPC · JPL
190382	1999 RY_{134}	—	September 9, 1999	Socorro	LINEAR	·	3.4 km	MPC · JPL
190383	1999 RN_{151}	—	September 9, 1999	Socorro	LINEAR	·	3.2 km	MPC · JPL
190384	1999 RZ_{181}	—	September 9, 1999	Socorro	LINEAR	MRX	1.5 km	MPC · JPL
190385	1999 RP_{202}	—	September 8, 1999	Socorro	LINEAR	·	3.7 km	MPC · JPL
190386	1999 RU_{202}	—	September 8, 1999	Socorro	LINEAR	·	3.5 km	MPC · JPL
190387	1999 RL_{209}	—	September 8, 1999	Socorro	LINEAR	·	3.7 km	MPC · JPL
190388	1999 RW_{247}	—	September 5, 1999	Kitt Peak	Spacewatch	·	3.2 km	MPC · JPL
190389	1999 SC_{15}	—	September 29, 1999	Catalina	CSS	·	3.7 km	MPC · JPL
190390	1999 TD_{60}	—	October 7, 1999	Kitt Peak	Spacewatch	·	2.8 km	MPC · JPL
190391	1999 TL_{77}	—	October 10, 1999	Kitt Peak	Spacewatch	KOR	2.0 km	MPC · JPL
190392	1999 TL_{82}	—	October 12, 1999	Kitt Peak	Spacewatch	GEF	1.9 km	MPC · JPL
190393	1999 TO_{101}	—	October 2, 1999	Socorro	LINEAR	·	5.1 km	MPC · JPL
190394	1999 TS_{108}	—	October 4, 1999	Socorro	LINEAR	DOR	4.4 km	MPC · JPL
190395	1999 TR_{109}	—	October 4, 1999	Socorro	LINEAR	GEF · slow	2.3 km	MPC · JPL
190396	1999 TZ_{124}	—	October 4, 1999	Socorro	LINEAR	MRX	1.9 km	MPC · JPL
190397	1999 TZ_{138}	—	October 6, 1999	Socorro	LINEAR	·	2.9 km	MPC · JPL
190398	1999 TE_{142}	—	October 7, 1999	Socorro	LINEAR	·	2.8 km	MPC · JPL
190399	1999 TQ_{144}	—	October 7, 1999	Socorro	LINEAR	DOR	5.5 km	MPC · JPL
190400	1999 TG_{145}	—	October 7, 1999	Socorro	LINEAR	·	4.1 km	MPC · JPL

== 190401–190500 ==
back to top

Designation			Discovery			Properties		Ref
Permanent	Provisional	Named after	Date	Site	Discoverer(s)	Category	Diam.	Ref
190401	1999 TL_{145}	—	October 7, 1999	Socorro	LINEAR	AGN	2.0 km	MPC · JPL
190402	1999 TK_{168}	—	October 10, 1999	Socorro	LINEAR	AGN	1.9 km	MPC · JPL
190403	1999 TV_{191}	—	October 12, 1999	Socorro	LINEAR	·	5.2 km	MPC · JPL
190404	1999 TA_{192}	—	October 12, 1999	Socorro	LINEAR	·	4.0 km	MPC · JPL
190405	1999 TF_{193}	—	October 12, 1999	Socorro	LINEAR	·	3.6 km	MPC · JPL
190406	1999 TR_{194}	—	October 12, 1999	Socorro	LINEAR	·	4.0 km	MPC · JPL
190407	1999 TK_{231}	—	October 5, 1999	Catalina	CSS	MRX	1.9 km	MPC · JPL
190408	1999 TM_{245}	—	October 7, 1999	Catalina	CSS	·	3.7 km	MPC · JPL
190409	1999 TR_{246}	—	October 6, 1999	Socorro	LINEAR	NEM	3.3 km	MPC · JPL
190410	1999 TX_{253}	—	October 11, 1999	Kitt Peak	Spacewatch	PAD	2.6 km	MPC · JPL
190411	1999 TF_{254}	—	October 12, 1999	Kitt Peak	Spacewatch	·	3.0 km	MPC · JPL
190412	1999 TN_{267}	—	October 3, 1999	Socorro	LINEAR	·	4.5 km	MPC · JPL
190413	1999 TN_{284}	—	October 9, 1999	Socorro	LINEAR	DOR	4.2 km	MPC · JPL
190414	1999 TF_{319}	—	October 9, 1999	Socorro	LINEAR	GEF	1.6 km	MPC · JPL
190415	1999 UP_{1}	—	October 17, 1999	Heppenheim	Starkenburg	·	4.4 km	MPC · JPL
190416	1999 UH_{8}	—	October 29, 1999	Catalina	CSS	·	3.3 km	MPC · JPL
190417	1999 UU_{12}	—	October 29, 1999	Catalina	CSS	·	3.3 km	MPC · JPL
190418	1999 UO_{35}	—	October 31, 1999	Catalina	CSS	·	4.8 km	MPC · JPL
190419	1999 VO_{54}	—	November 4, 1999	Socorro	LINEAR	(13314)	4.5 km	MPC · JPL
190420	1999 VZ_{70}	—	November 4, 1999	Socorro	LINEAR	·	3.0 km	MPC · JPL
190421	1999 VN_{79}	—	November 4, 1999	Socorro	LINEAR	GEF	2.1 km	MPC · JPL
190422	1999 VG_{92}	—	November 9, 1999	Socorro	LINEAR	·	3.8 km	MPC · JPL
190423	1999 VZ_{107}	—	November 9, 1999	Socorro	LINEAR	KOR	2.2 km	MPC · JPL
190424	1999 VA_{114}	—	November 9, 1999	Catalina	CSS	·	4.3 km	MPC · JPL
190425	1999 VM_{137}	—	November 12, 1999	Socorro	LINEAR	KOR	2.1 km	MPC · JPL
190426	1999 VW_{138}	—	November 9, 1999	Kitt Peak	Spacewatch	·	1.1 km	MPC · JPL
190427	1999 VV_{150}	—	November 14, 1999	Socorro	LINEAR	HOF	4.7 km	MPC · JPL
190428	1999 VS_{159}	—	November 14, 1999	Socorro	LINEAR	DOR	4.1 km	MPC · JPL
190429	1999 VB_{180}	—	November 6, 1999	Socorro	LINEAR	·	3.7 km	MPC · JPL
190430	1999 VB_{189}	—	November 15, 1999	Socorro	LINEAR	·	4.3 km	MPC · JPL
190431	1999 VZ_{194}	—	November 3, 1999	Socorro	LINEAR	EUN	2.9 km	MPC · JPL
190432	1999 WO_{17}	—	November 30, 1999	Kitt Peak	Spacewatch	·	3.0 km	MPC · JPL
190433	1999 XC_{59}	—	December 7, 1999	Socorro	LINEAR	·	3.0 km	MPC · JPL
190434	1999 XX_{78}	—	December 7, 1999	Socorro	LINEAR	GEF	2.6 km	MPC · JPL
190435	1999 XN_{146}	—	December 7, 1999	Kitt Peak	Spacewatch	·	4.2 km	MPC · JPL
190436	1999 XT_{181}	—	December 12, 1999	Socorro	LINEAR	·	3.9 km	MPC · JPL
190437	1999 XS_{182}	—	December 12, 1999	Socorro	LINEAR	BRA	2.9 km	MPC · JPL
190438	1999 XD_{193}	—	December 12, 1999	Socorro	LINEAR	DOR	5.1 km	MPC · JPL
190439	1999 XQ_{203}	—	December 12, 1999	Socorro	LINEAR	fast	3.8 km	MPC · JPL
190440	1999 XV_{217}	—	December 13, 1999	Kitt Peak	Spacewatch	KOR	2.0 km	MPC · JPL
190441	1999 XB_{220}	—	December 12, 1999	Socorro	LINEAR	·	4.3 km	MPC · JPL
190442	1999 XE_{225}	—	December 13, 1999	Kitt Peak	Spacewatch	L4	10 km	MPC · JPL
190443	1999 XS_{246}	—	December 5, 1999	Kitt Peak	Spacewatch	·	800 m	MPC · JPL
190444	1999 YM_{9}	—	December 31, 1999	Oizumi	T. Kobayashi	·	4.2 km	MPC · JPL
190445	1999 YB_{10}	—	December 27, 1999	Kitt Peak	Spacewatch	KOR	2.1 km	MPC · JPL
190446	2000 AL_{8}	—	January 2, 2000	Socorro	LINEAR	L4	20 km	MPC · JPL
190447	2000 AR_{11}	—	January 3, 2000	Socorro	LINEAR	·	3.5 km	MPC · JPL
190448	2000 AO_{35}	—	January 3, 2000	Socorro	LINEAR	·	3.0 km	MPC · JPL
190449	2000 AO_{52}	—	January 4, 2000	Socorro	LINEAR	·	5.3 km	MPC · JPL
190450	2000 AZ_{78}	—	January 5, 2000	Socorro	LINEAR	·	4.0 km	MPC · JPL
190451	2000 AX_{146}	—	January 7, 2000	Socorro	LINEAR	·	1.9 km	MPC · JPL
190452	2000 AS_{211}	—	January 5, 2000	Kitt Peak	Spacewatch	·	2.9 km	MPC · JPL
190453	2000 AQ_{235}	—	January 5, 2000	Socorro	LINEAR	·	3.6 km	MPC · JPL
190454	2000 BR_{12}	—	January 28, 2000	Kitt Peak	Spacewatch	THM	3.2 km	MPC · JPL
190455	2000 BU_{13}	—	January 29, 2000	Kitt Peak	Spacewatch	·	3.5 km	MPC · JPL
190456	2000 BC_{32}	—	January 30, 2000	Catalina	CSS	·	3.2 km	MPC · JPL
190457	2000 BR_{32}	—	January 28, 2000	Kitt Peak	Spacewatch	EOS	3.1 km	MPC · JPL
190458	2000 BG_{40}	—	January 29, 2000	Kitt Peak	Spacewatch	L4	20 km	MPC · JPL
190459	2000 CN_{7}	—	February 2, 2000	Socorro	LINEAR	EOS	4.3 km	MPC · JPL
190460	2000 CO_{9}	—	February 2, 2000	Socorro	LINEAR	EOS	4.4 km	MPC · JPL
190461	2000 CP_{39}	—	February 3, 2000	Višnjan Observatory	K. Korlević	·	1.4 km	MPC · JPL
190462	2000 CY_{41}	—	February 2, 2000	Socorro	LINEAR	·	1.1 km	MPC · JPL
190463	2000 CE_{57}	—	February 5, 2000	Socorro	LINEAR	·	3.9 km	MPC · JPL
190464	2000 CU_{59}	—	February 2, 2000	Socorro	LINEAR	·	3.2 km	MPC · JPL
190465	2000 CS_{78}	—	February 8, 2000	Kitt Peak	Spacewatch	·	1.4 km	MPC · JPL
190466	2000 CH_{102}	—	February 2, 2000	Socorro	LINEAR	·	5.7 km	MPC · JPL
190467	2000 CP_{111}	—	February 6, 2000	Catalina	CSS	·	4.9 km	MPC · JPL
190468	2000 CQ_{138}	—	February 5, 2000	Kitt Peak	Spacewatch	V	940 m	MPC · JPL
190469	2000 DC_{10}	—	February 26, 2000	Kitt Peak	Spacewatch	·	3.7 km	MPC · JPL
190470	2000 DX_{10}	—	February 26, 2000	Kitt Peak	Spacewatch	·	3.0 km	MPC · JPL
190471	2000 DG_{27}	—	February 29, 2000	Socorro	LINEAR	·	6.7 km	MPC · JPL
190472	2000 DF_{44}	—	February 29, 2000	Socorro	LINEAR	·	7.4 km	MPC · JPL
190473	2000 DT_{46}	—	February 29, 2000	Socorro	LINEAR	·	1.1 km	MPC · JPL
190474	2000 DL_{52}	—	February 29, 2000	Socorro	LINEAR	·	5.4 km	MPC · JPL
190475	2000 DR_{64}	—	February 29, 2000	Socorro	LINEAR	·	950 m	MPC · JPL
190476	2000 DZ_{70}	—	February 29, 2000	Socorro	LINEAR	·	3.3 km	MPC · JPL
190477	2000 DX_{88}	—	February 25, 2000	Kitt Peak	Spacewatch	·	1.4 km	MPC · JPL
190478	2000 DW_{96}	—	February 29, 2000	Socorro	LINEAR	·	4.9 km	MPC · JPL
190479	2000 DA_{97}	—	February 29, 2000	Socorro	LINEAR	·	6.3 km	MPC · JPL
190480	2000 DG_{109}	—	February 29, 2000	Socorro	LINEAR	EOS	3.5 km	MPC · JPL
190481	2000 DN_{111}	—	February 29, 2000	Socorro	LINEAR	·	2.9 km	MPC · JPL
190482	2000 DU_{113}	—	February 27, 2000	Kitt Peak	Spacewatch	·	5.6 km	MPC · JPL
190483	2000 EC_{2}	—	March 3, 2000	Socorro	LINEAR	·	1.6 km	MPC · JPL
190484	2000 ET_{2}	—	March 3, 2000	Socorro	LINEAR	·	1.1 km	MPC · JPL
190485	2000 EE_{3}	—	March 3, 2000	Socorro	LINEAR	·	1.2 km	MPC · JPL
190486	2000 EO_{9}	—	March 3, 2000	Socorro	LINEAR	·	4.3 km	MPC · JPL
190487	2000 EM_{10}	—	March 3, 2000	Socorro	LINEAR	·	1.2 km	MPC · JPL
190488	2000 EF_{58}	—	March 8, 2000	Socorro	LINEAR	·	1.7 km	MPC · JPL
190489	2000 EW_{61}	—	March 10, 2000	Socorro	LINEAR	·	6.7 km	MPC · JPL
190490	2000 EU_{172}	—	March 1, 2000	Kitt Peak	Spacewatch	·	1.4 km	MPC · JPL
190491	2000 FJ_{10}	—	March 25, 2000	Kitt Peak	Spacewatch	AMO · APO	220 m	MPC · JPL
190492	2000 FL_{42}	—	March 29, 2000	Socorro	LINEAR	·	3.3 km	MPC · JPL
190493	2000 GO_{11}	—	April 5, 2000	Socorro	LINEAR	·	1.4 km	MPC · JPL
190494	2000 GG_{42}	—	April 5, 2000	Socorro	LINEAR	·	1.6 km	MPC · JPL
190495	2000 GN_{45}	—	April 5, 2000	Socorro	LINEAR	·	2.2 km	MPC · JPL
190496	2000 GC_{55}	—	April 5, 2000	Socorro	LINEAR	·	2.0 km	MPC · JPL
190497	2000 GT_{101}	—	April 7, 2000	Socorro	LINEAR	·	1.9 km	MPC · JPL
190498	2000 GB_{111}	—	April 2, 2000	Anderson Mesa	LONEOS	·	2.0 km	MPC · JPL
190499	2000 GP_{111}	—	April 3, 2000	Anderson Mesa	LONEOS	·	1.1 km	MPC · JPL
190500	2000 GX_{111}	—	April 3, 2000	Anderson Mesa	LONEOS	LIX	6.0 km	MPC · JPL

== 190501–190600 ==
back to top

Designation			Discovery			Properties		Ref
Permanent	Provisional	Named after	Date	Site	Discoverer(s)	Category	Diam.	Ref
190501	2000 GV_{145}	—	April 12, 2000	Kitt Peak	Spacewatch	MAS	780 m	MPC · JPL
190502	2000 GT_{170}	—	April 5, 2000	Anderson Mesa	LONEOS	NYS	1.4 km	MPC · JPL
190503	2000 GT_{177}	—	April 3, 2000	Kitt Peak	Spacewatch	·	1.3 km	MPC · JPL
190504 Hermanottó	2000 HE	Hermanottó	April 22, 2000	Piszkéstető	K. Sárneczky, Szabo, G.	NYS	1.3 km	MPC · JPL
190505	2000 HS_{4}	—	April 27, 2000	Kitt Peak	Spacewatch	·	1.5 km	MPC · JPL
190506	2000 HO_{18}	—	April 25, 2000	Kitt Peak	Spacewatch	·	1.3 km	MPC · JPL
190507	2000 HU_{26}	—	April 24, 2000	Anderson Mesa	LONEOS	NYS	2.0 km	MPC · JPL
190508	2000 HM_{43}	—	April 29, 2000	Kitt Peak	Spacewatch	·	1.6 km	MPC · JPL
190509	2000 HX_{47}	—	April 29, 2000	Socorro	LINEAR	fast	1.5 km	MPC · JPL
190510	2000 HH_{60}	—	April 25, 2000	Anderson Mesa	LONEOS	NYS	1.9 km	MPC · JPL
190511	2000 HL_{72}	—	April 25, 2000	Anderson Mesa	LONEOS	NYS	1.8 km	MPC · JPL
190512	2000 JE_{22}	—	May 6, 2000	Socorro	LINEAR	·	2.8 km	MPC · JPL
190513	2000 JP_{25}	—	May 7, 2000	Socorro	LINEAR	·	1.2 km	MPC · JPL
190514	2000 JO_{42}	—	May 7, 2000	Socorro	LINEAR	NYS	1.5 km	MPC · JPL
190515	2000 JO_{49}	—	May 9, 2000	Socorro	LINEAR	·	1.6 km	MPC · JPL
190516	2000 JT_{73}	—	May 2, 2000	Anderson Mesa	LONEOS	PHO	4.2 km	MPC · JPL
190517	2000 KE_{8}	—	May 27, 2000	Socorro	LINEAR	·	1.6 km	MPC · JPL
190518	2000 KF_{43}	—	May 26, 2000	Kitt Peak	Spacewatch	MAS	1.0 km	MPC · JPL
190519	2000 NR_{17}	—	July 5, 2000	Anderson Mesa	LONEOS	·	1.6 km	MPC · JPL
190520	2000 PN_{26}	—	August 5, 2000	Haleakala	NEAT	·	6.0 km	MPC · JPL
190521	2000 QV_{21}	—	August 24, 2000	Socorro	LINEAR	·	1.3 km	MPC · JPL
190522	2000 QM_{44}	—	August 24, 2000	Socorro	LINEAR	·	1.8 km	MPC · JPL
190523	2000 QK_{93}	—	August 25, 2000	Socorro	LINEAR	·	2.7 km	MPC · JPL
190524	2000 QJ_{108}	—	August 29, 2000	Socorro	LINEAR	·	1.6 km	MPC · JPL
190525	2000 QX_{124}	—	August 29, 2000	Socorro	LINEAR	NYS	2.8 km	MPC · JPL
190526	2000 QC_{170}	—	August 31, 2000	Socorro	LINEAR	(5)	1.5 km	MPC · JPL
190527	2000 QB_{180}	—	August 29, 2000	Socorro	LINEAR	·	1.6 km	MPC · JPL
190528	2000 QQ_{181}	—	August 31, 2000	Socorro	LINEAR	(5)	2.9 km	MPC · JPL
190529	2000 QD_{184}	—	August 26, 2000	Socorro	LINEAR	·	1.9 km	MPC · JPL
190530	2000 QS_{189}	—	August 26, 2000	Socorro	LINEAR	·	1.6 km	MPC · JPL
190531	2000 QS_{194}	—	August 31, 2000	Socorro	LINEAR	·	2.1 km	MPC · JPL
190532	2000 QX_{215}	—	August 31, 2000	Socorro	LINEAR	·	1.6 km	MPC · JPL
190533	2000 RN_{5}	—	September 1, 2000	Socorro	LINEAR	RAF	1.7 km	MPC · JPL
190534	2000 RH_{8}	—	September 1, 2000	Socorro	LINEAR	H ·	910 m	MPC · JPL
190535	2000 RM_{28}	—	September 1, 2000	Socorro	LINEAR	(5)	1.8 km	MPC · JPL
190536	2000 RQ_{35}	—	September 2, 2000	Socorro	LINEAR	H	870 m	MPC · JPL
190537	2000 RS_{45}	—	September 3, 2000	Socorro	LINEAR	(5)	2.1 km	MPC · JPL
190538	2000 RS_{48}	—	September 3, 2000	Socorro	LINEAR	H	1.1 km	MPC · JPL
190539	2000 RX_{60}	—	September 6, 2000	Socorro	LINEAR	·	2.0 km	MPC · JPL
190540	2000 RE_{67}	—	September 1, 2000	Socorro	LINEAR	·	2.1 km	MPC · JPL
190541	2000 RO_{77}	—	September 8, 2000	Socorro	LINEAR	H	1.4 km	MPC · JPL
190542	2000 RR_{78}	—	September 8, 2000	Kitt Peak	Spacewatch	·	1.2 km	MPC · JPL
190543	2000 RM_{80}	—	September 1, 2000	Socorro	LINEAR	·	930 m	MPC · JPL
190544	2000 RQ_{87}	—	September 2, 2000	Anderson Mesa	LONEOS	·	1.3 km	MPC · JPL
190545	2000 RZ_{89}	—	September 3, 2000	Socorro	LINEAR	·	1.7 km	MPC · JPL
190546	2000 SW_{14}	—	September 23, 2000	Socorro	LINEAR	·	2.6 km	MPC · JPL
190547	2000 SA_{19}	—	September 23, 2000	Socorro	LINEAR	·	1.9 km	MPC · JPL
190548	2000 SU_{28}	—	September 23, 2000	Socorro	LINEAR	·	2.0 km	MPC · JPL
190549	2000 SP_{37}	—	September 24, 2000	Socorro	LINEAR	·	3.1 km	MPC · JPL
190550	2000 SD_{44}	—	September 24, 2000	Socorro	LINEAR	H	1.0 km	MPC · JPL
190551	2000 SK_{48}	—	September 23, 2000	Socorro	LINEAR	·	1.7 km	MPC · JPL
190552	2000 SV_{49}	—	September 23, 2000	Socorro	LINEAR	·	2.0 km	MPC · JPL
190553	2000 SB_{65}	—	September 24, 2000	Socorro	LINEAR	·	2.0 km	MPC · JPL
190554	2000 SU_{65}	—	September 24, 2000	Socorro	LINEAR	·	1.5 km	MPC · JPL
190555	2000 SY_{67}	—	September 24, 2000	Socorro	LINEAR	·	2.0 km	MPC · JPL
190556	2000 SV_{73}	—	September 24, 2000	Socorro	LINEAR	·	2.2 km	MPC · JPL
190557	2000 SH_{77}	—	September 24, 2000	Socorro	LINEAR	·	1.5 km	MPC · JPL
190558	2000 SE_{78}	—	September 24, 2000	Socorro	LINEAR	·	1.3 km	MPC · JPL
190559	2000 SK_{79}	—	September 24, 2000	Socorro	LINEAR	·	2.4 km	MPC · JPL
190560	2000 SU_{86}	—	September 24, 2000	Socorro	LINEAR	EUN	2.0 km	MPC · JPL
190561	2000 SY_{99}	—	September 23, 2000	Socorro	LINEAR	EUN	1.8 km	MPC · JPL
190562	2000 SP_{106}	—	September 24, 2000	Socorro	LINEAR	·	1.2 km	MPC · JPL
190563	2000 SL_{123}	—	September 24, 2000	Socorro	LINEAR	·	2.1 km	MPC · JPL
190564	2000 SU_{128}	—	September 24, 2000	Socorro	LINEAR	·	2.2 km	MPC · JPL
190565	2000 SU_{131}	—	September 22, 2000	Socorro	LINEAR	·	4.9 km	MPC · JPL
190566	2000 SJ_{132}	—	September 22, 2000	Socorro	LINEAR	·	3.8 km	MPC · JPL
190567	2000 SL_{137}	—	September 23, 2000	Socorro	LINEAR	·	1.4 km	MPC · JPL
190568	2000 SQ_{183}	—	September 20, 2000	Haleakala	NEAT	·	1.2 km	MPC · JPL
190569	2000 SY_{190}	—	September 23, 2000	Socorro	LINEAR	·	1.9 km	MPC · JPL
190570	2000 SO_{203}	—	September 24, 2000	Socorro	LINEAR	·	1.4 km	MPC · JPL
190571	2000 SH_{206}	—	September 24, 2000	Socorro	LINEAR	(5)	1.4 km	MPC · JPL
190572	2000 SK_{209}	—	September 25, 2000	Socorro	LINEAR	(5)	2.4 km	MPC · JPL
190573	2000 SN_{211}	—	September 25, 2000	Socorro	LINEAR	·	2.5 km	MPC · JPL
190574	2000 SR_{227}	—	September 27, 2000	Socorro	LINEAR	EUN	1.9 km	MPC · JPL
190575	2000 SC_{243}	—	September 24, 2000	Socorro	LINEAR	·	1.3 km	MPC · JPL
190576	2000 SZ_{270}	—	September 27, 2000	Socorro	LINEAR	(5)	1.5 km	MPC · JPL
190577	2000 SE_{272}	—	September 28, 2000	Socorro	LINEAR	·	2.3 km	MPC · JPL
190578	2000 SQ_{274}	—	September 28, 2000	Socorro	LINEAR	·	2.0 km	MPC · JPL
190579	2000 SB_{287}	—	September 26, 2000	Socorro	LINEAR	·	4.2 km	MPC · JPL
190580	2000 SB_{295}	—	September 27, 2000	Socorro	LINEAR	·	2.4 km	MPC · JPL
190581	2000 SE_{296}	—	September 27, 2000	Socorro	LINEAR	·	3.7 km	MPC · JPL
190582	2000 SO_{299}	—	September 28, 2000	Socorro	LINEAR	·	1.2 km	MPC · JPL
190583	2000 SD_{309}	—	September 30, 2000	Socorro	LINEAR	·	1.9 km	MPC · JPL
190584	2000 SH_{311}	—	September 26, 2000	Socorro	LINEAR	·	4.7 km	MPC · JPL
190585	2000 SF_{339}	—	September 25, 2000	Socorro	LINEAR	·	3.5 km	MPC · JPL
190586	2000 SX_{354}	—	September 29, 2000	Anderson Mesa	LONEOS	·	2.9 km	MPC · JPL
190587	2000 SQ_{361}	—	September 23, 2000	Anderson Mesa	LONEOS	(5)	1.7 km	MPC · JPL
190588	2000 SN_{363}	—	September 22, 2000	Anderson Mesa	LONEOS	LIX	6.3 km	MPC · JPL
190589	2000 TY_{3}	—	October 1, 2000	Socorro	LINEAR	·	1.8 km	MPC · JPL
190590	2000 TU_{10}	—	October 1, 2000	Socorro	LINEAR	·	1.4 km	MPC · JPL
190591	2000 TA_{15}	—	October 1, 2000	Socorro	LINEAR	·	1.5 km	MPC · JPL
190592	2000 TQ_{35}	—	October 6, 2000	Anderson Mesa	LONEOS	·	1.1 km	MPC · JPL
190593	2000 TH_{44}	—	October 1, 2000	Socorro	LINEAR	(13314)	2.9 km	MPC · JPL
190594	2000 TY_{61}	—	October 2, 2000	Anderson Mesa	LONEOS	·	2.4 km	MPC · JPL
190595	2000 TP_{62}	—	October 2, 2000	Socorro	LINEAR	·	2.0 km	MPC · JPL
190596	2000 UP_{2}	—	October 23, 2000	Desert Beaver	W. K. Y. Yeung	·	2.7 km	MPC · JPL
190597	2000 UD_{24}	—	October 24, 2000	Socorro	LINEAR	EUN	2.1 km	MPC · JPL
190598	2000 UY_{45}	—	October 24, 2000	Socorro	LINEAR	ADE	4.1 km	MPC · JPL
190599	2000 UR_{50}	—	October 24, 2000	Socorro	LINEAR	RAF	2.0 km	MPC · JPL
190600	2000 UL_{70}	—	October 25, 2000	Socorro	LINEAR	(5)	2.3 km	MPC · JPL

== 190601–190700 ==
back to top

Designation			Discovery			Properties		Ref
Permanent	Provisional	Named after	Date	Site	Discoverer(s)	Category	Diam.	Ref
190601	2000 UP_{75}	—	October 31, 2000	Socorro	LINEAR	(5)	1.9 km	MPC · JPL
190602	2000 UZ_{79}	—	October 24, 2000	Socorro	LINEAR	BAR	2.2 km	MPC · JPL
190603	2000 UV_{80}	—	October 24, 2000	Socorro	LINEAR	·	1.7 km	MPC · JPL
190604	2000 UG_{89}	—	October 31, 2000	Socorro	LINEAR	EUN	2.0 km	MPC · JPL
190605	2000 UX_{91}	—	October 25, 2000	Socorro	LINEAR	·	1.5 km	MPC · JPL
190606	2000 UO_{99}	—	October 25, 2000	Socorro	LINEAR	(5)	2.3 km	MPC · JPL
190607	2000 UJ_{109}	—	October 31, 2000	Socorro	LINEAR	·	2.6 km	MPC · JPL
190608	2000 VD_{24}	—	November 1, 2000	Socorro	LINEAR	·	2.6 km	MPC · JPL
190609	2000 VH_{24}	—	November 1, 2000	Socorro	LINEAR	·	2.1 km	MPC · JPL
190610	2000 VY_{36}	—	November 1, 2000	Socorro	LINEAR	·	2.9 km	MPC · JPL
190611	2000 VN_{38}	—	November 1, 2000	Kitt Peak	Spacewatch	·	1.3 km	MPC · JPL
190612	2000 VZ_{46}	—	November 3, 2000	Socorro	LINEAR	·	1.8 km	MPC · JPL
190613	2000 VJ_{49}	—	November 2, 2000	Socorro	LINEAR	(5)	2.9 km	MPC · JPL
190614	2000 VJ_{54}	—	November 3, 2000	Socorro	LINEAR	(5)	2.7 km	MPC · JPL
190615	2000 VN_{59}	—	November 6, 2000	Socorro	LINEAR	·	2.7 km	MPC · JPL
190616	2000 WA_{7}	—	November 19, 2000	Socorro	LINEAR	·	4.3 km	MPC · JPL
190617 Alexandergerst	2000 WT_{9}	Alexandergerst	November 19, 2000	Drebach	J. Kandler	(5)	1.7 km	MPC · JPL
190618	2000 WM_{18}	—	November 21, 2000	Socorro	LINEAR	MIS	3.2 km	MPC · JPL
190619	2000 WM_{25}	—	November 21, 2000	Socorro	LINEAR	·	2.3 km	MPC · JPL
190620	2000 WC_{39}	—	November 20, 2000	Socorro	LINEAR	·	2.0 km	MPC · JPL
190621	2000 WJ_{46}	—	November 21, 2000	Socorro	LINEAR	·	2.1 km	MPC · JPL
190622	2000 WT_{49}	—	November 25, 2000	Socorro	LINEAR	H	1.3 km	MPC · JPL
190623	2000 WD_{58}	—	November 21, 2000	Socorro	LINEAR	(5)	1.7 km	MPC · JPL
190624	2000 WW_{68}	—	November 19, 2000	Socorro	LINEAR	MAR	2.1 km	MPC · JPL
190625	2000 WB_{85}	—	November 20, 2000	Socorro	LINEAR	·	2.2 km	MPC · JPL
190626	2000 WS_{91}	—	November 21, 2000	Socorro	LINEAR	·	2.0 km	MPC · JPL
190627	2000 WP_{94}	—	November 21, 2000	Socorro	LINEAR	EUN	2.5 km	MPC · JPL
190628	2000 WW_{112}	—	November 20, 2000	Socorro	LINEAR	·	2.3 km	MPC · JPL
190629	2000 WT_{114}	—	November 20, 2000	Socorro	LINEAR	(5)	2.2 km	MPC · JPL
190630	2000 WZ_{124}	—	November 27, 2000	Haleakala	NEAT	·	2.7 km	MPC · JPL
190631	2000 WT_{129}	—	November 19, 2000	Kitt Peak	Spacewatch	·	2.3 km	MPC · JPL
190632	2000 WT_{131}	—	November 20, 2000	Anderson Mesa	LONEOS	·	2.6 km	MPC · JPL
190633	2000 WH_{135}	—	November 19, 2000	Socorro	LINEAR	EUN	3.3 km	MPC · JPL
190634	2000 WG_{141}	—	November 19, 2000	Socorro	LINEAR	·	4.5 km	MPC · JPL
190635	2000 WX_{148}	—	November 29, 2000	Haleakala	NEAT	·	1.8 km	MPC · JPL
190636	2000 WE_{151}	—	November 27, 2000	Socorro	LINEAR	·	2.6 km	MPC · JPL
190637	2000 WE_{155}	—	November 30, 2000	Socorro	LINEAR	EUN	2.3 km	MPC · JPL
190638	2000 WD_{164}	—	November 21, 2000	Socorro	LINEAR	EUN	2.6 km	MPC · JPL
190639	2000 WZ_{171}	—	November 25, 2000	Socorro	LINEAR	EUN	2.3 km	MPC · JPL
190640	2000 WO_{172}	—	November 25, 2000	Socorro	LINEAR	·	2.9 km	MPC · JPL
190641	2000 XD_{3}	—	December 1, 2000	Socorro	LINEAR	·	2.4 km	MPC · JPL
190642	2000 XX_{5}	—	December 1, 2000	Socorro	LINEAR	·	3.8 km	MPC · JPL
190643	2000 XH_{8}	—	December 1, 2000	Socorro	LINEAR	ADE	4.6 km	MPC · JPL
190644	2000 XS_{9}	—	December 1, 2000	Socorro	LINEAR	·	3.1 km	MPC · JPL
190645	2000 XC_{18}	—	December 4, 2000	Socorro	LINEAR	ADE	3.9 km	MPC · JPL
190646	2000 XD_{20}	—	December 4, 2000	Socorro	LINEAR	EUN	2.0 km	MPC · JPL
190647	2000 XH_{24}	—	December 4, 2000	Socorro	LINEAR	·	3.2 km	MPC · JPL
190648	2000 XS_{24}	—	December 4, 2000	Socorro	LINEAR	·	3.1 km	MPC · JPL
190649	2000 XF_{26}	—	December 4, 2000	Socorro	LINEAR	EUN	3.3 km	MPC · JPL
190650	2000 XN_{40}	—	December 5, 2000	Socorro	LINEAR	JUN	4.3 km	MPC · JPL
190651	2000 XM_{46}	—	December 7, 2000	Socorro	LINEAR	JUN	2.3 km	MPC · JPL
190652	2000 XW_{46}	—	December 7, 2000	Socorro	LINEAR	·	2.3 km	MPC · JPL
190653	2000 XD_{48}	—	December 4, 2000	Socorro	LINEAR	·	3.1 km	MPC · JPL
190654	2000 XJ_{48}	—	December 4, 2000	Socorro	LINEAR	·	2.8 km	MPC · JPL
190655	2000 YT_{25}	—	December 22, 2000	Socorro	LINEAR	·	3.4 km	MPC · JPL
190656	2000 YH_{40}	—	December 30, 2000	Socorro	LINEAR	·	3.2 km	MPC · JPL
190657	2000 YJ_{40}	—	December 30, 2000	Socorro	LINEAR	·	3.7 km	MPC · JPL
190658	2000 YA_{44}	—	December 30, 2000	Socorro	LINEAR	·	2.3 km	MPC · JPL
190659	2000 YO_{57}	—	December 30, 2000	Socorro	LINEAR	·	3.7 km	MPC · JPL
190660	2000 YE_{67}	—	December 28, 2000	Socorro	LINEAR	ADE	5.7 km	MPC · JPL
190661	2000 YT_{84}	—	December 30, 2000	Socorro	LINEAR	·	3.6 km	MPC · JPL
190662	2000 YD_{86}	—	December 30, 2000	Socorro	LINEAR	·	3.3 km	MPC · JPL
190663	2000 YF_{88}	—	December 30, 2000	Socorro	LINEAR	·	2.3 km	MPC · JPL
190664	2000 YX_{90}	—	December 30, 2000	Socorro	LINEAR	·	1.9 km	MPC · JPL
190665	2000 YG_{98}	—	December 30, 2000	Socorro	LINEAR	L4	20 km	MPC · JPL
190666	2000 YB_{99}	—	December 30, 2000	Socorro	LINEAR	·	3.2 km	MPC · JPL
190667	2000 YD_{108}	—	December 30, 2000	Socorro	LINEAR	·	2.2 km	MPC · JPL
190668	2000 YK_{112}	—	December 30, 2000	Socorro	LINEAR	·	2.3 km	MPC · JPL
190669	2000 YJ_{117}	—	December 30, 2000	Socorro	LINEAR	L4	20 km	MPC · JPL
190670	2001 AU_{19}	—	January 5, 2001	Oaxaca	Roe, J. M.	·	2.7 km	MPC · JPL
190671	2001 AS_{22}	—	January 3, 2001	Socorro	LINEAR	·	3.1 km	MPC · JPL
190672	2001 AR_{26}	—	January 5, 2001	Socorro	LINEAR	·	1.9 km	MPC · JPL
190673	2001 AZ_{45}	—	January 15, 2001	Socorro	LINEAR	BAR	2.6 km	MPC · JPL
190674	2001 BZ_{18}	—	January 19, 2001	Socorro	LINEAR	L4	20 km	MPC · JPL
190675	2001 BU_{20}	—	January 19, 2001	Socorro	LINEAR	·	3.3 km	MPC · JPL
190676	2001 BO_{34}	—	January 20, 2001	Socorro	LINEAR	·	3.1 km	MPC · JPL
190677	2001 BQ_{61}	—	January 24, 2001	Haleakala	NEAT	·	3.9 km	MPC · JPL
190678	2001 BQ_{63}	—	January 29, 2001	Socorro	LINEAR	·	4.3 km	MPC · JPL
190679	2001 BE_{73}	—	January 28, 2001	Haleakala	NEAT	EUN	2.2 km	MPC · JPL
190680	2001 CM_{2}	—	February 1, 2001	Socorro	LINEAR	GEF	2.6 km	MPC · JPL
190681	2001 CW_{23}	—	February 1, 2001	Anderson Mesa	LONEOS	L4	10 km	MPC · JPL
190682	2001 CF_{31}	—	February 2, 2001	Haleakala	NEAT	·	4.0 km	MPC · JPL
190683	2001 CR_{47}	—	February 12, 2001	Anderson Mesa	LONEOS	GEF	2.3 km	MPC · JPL
190684	2001 DW_{15}	—	February 16, 2001	Socorro	LINEAR	EOS	3.1 km	MPC · JPL
190685	2001 DF_{25}	—	February 17, 2001	Socorro	LINEAR	BRA	2.0 km	MPC · JPL
190686	2001 DG_{36}	—	February 19, 2001	Socorro	LINEAR	·	3.4 km	MPC · JPL
190687	2001 DW_{40}	—	February 19, 2001	Socorro	LINEAR	·	3.7 km	MPC · JPL
190688	2001 DB_{89}	—	February 27, 2001	Kitt Peak	Spacewatch	·	3.0 km	MPC · JPL
190689	2001 DO_{93}	—	February 19, 2001	Socorro	LINEAR	L4	20 km	MPC · JPL
190690	2001 DO_{105}	—	February 16, 2001	Anderson Mesa	LONEOS	MRX	1.8 km	MPC · JPL
190691	2001 EG_{3}	—	March 4, 2001	Kitt Peak	Spacewatch	slow	3.2 km	MPC · JPL
190692	2001 EC_{7}	—	March 2, 2001	Anderson Mesa	LONEOS	·	6.6 km	MPC · JPL
190693	2001 ED_{13}	—	March 14, 2001	Socorro	LINEAR	T_{j} (2.97)	8.5 km	MPC · JPL
190694	2001 EX_{24}	—	March 15, 2001	Socorro	LINEAR	·	6.5 km	MPC · JPL
190695	2001 FX_{1}	—	March 16, 2001	Socorro	LINEAR	·	6.4 km	MPC · JPL
190696	2001 FT_{14}	—	March 19, 2001	Anderson Mesa	LONEOS	·	3.6 km	MPC · JPL
190697	2001 FQ_{16}	—	March 19, 2001	Anderson Mesa	LONEOS	·	5.3 km	MPC · JPL
190698	2001 FG_{30}	—	March 20, 2001	Haleakala	NEAT	·	4.9 km	MPC · JPL
190699	2001 FR_{30}	—	March 21, 2001	Haleakala	NEAT	·	1.1 km	MPC · JPL
190700	2001 FO_{45}	—	March 18, 2001	Socorro	LINEAR	EOS	3.8 km	MPC · JPL

== 190701–190800 ==
back to top

Designation			Discovery			Properties		Ref
Permanent	Provisional	Named after	Date	Site	Discoverer(s)	Category	Diam.	Ref
190701	2001 FZ_{56}	—	March 23, 2001	Anderson Mesa	LONEOS	·	7.0 km	MPC · JPL
190702	2001 FN_{85}	—	March 26, 2001	Kitt Peak	Spacewatch	HYG	3.6 km	MPC · JPL
190703	2001 FW_{123}	—	March 23, 2001	Anderson Mesa	LONEOS	·	4.4 km	MPC · JPL
190704	2001 FY_{125}	—	March 28, 2001	Kitt Peak	Spacewatch	·	7.2 km	MPC · JPL
190705	2001 FW_{146}	—	March 24, 2001	Anderson Mesa	LONEOS	·	3.6 km	MPC · JPL
190706	2001 FK_{158}	—	March 27, 2001	Haleakala	NEAT	·	3.4 km	MPC · JPL
190707	2001 FC_{159}	—	March 29, 2001	Anderson Mesa	LONEOS	·	2.5 km	MPC · JPL
190708	2001 FB_{168}	—	March 20, 2001	Kitt Peak	Spacewatch	TRE	2.4 km	MPC · JPL
190709	2001 FV_{178}	—	March 20, 2001	Anderson Mesa	LONEOS	·	4.3 km	MPC · JPL
190710 Marktapley	2001 FA_{185}	Marktapley	March 26, 2001	Kitt Peak	M. W. Buie	EOS	3.5 km	MPC · JPL
190711	2001 FF_{188}	—	March 16, 2001	Socorro	LINEAR	·	6.2 km	MPC · JPL
190712	2001 GZ_{7}	—	April 15, 2001	Socorro	LINEAR	·	2.9 km	MPC · JPL
190713	2001 HK_{19}	—	April 24, 2001	Kitt Peak	Spacewatch	·	880 m	MPC · JPL
190714	2001 KX_{5}	—	May 17, 2001	Socorro	LINEAR	·	1.0 km	MPC · JPL
190715	2001 KQ_{7}	—	May 18, 2001	Socorro	LINEAR	·	1.2 km	MPC · JPL
190716	2001 KH_{32}	—	May 24, 2001	Kitt Peak	Spacewatch	·	1.2 km	MPC · JPL
190717	2001 KH_{34}	—	May 18, 2001	Socorro	LINEAR	·	1.2 km	MPC · JPL
190718	2001 KK_{53}	—	May 18, 2001	Socorro	LINEAR	·	4.3 km	MPC · JPL
190719	2001 NE_{8}	—	July 14, 2001	Palomar	NEAT	·	1.2 km	MPC · JPL
190720	2001 NL_{10}	—	July 14, 2001	Haleakala	NEAT	·	1.2 km	MPC · JPL
190721	2001 OK_{23}	—	July 22, 2001	Palomar	NEAT	·	1.5 km	MPC · JPL
190722	2001 ON_{39}	—	July 20, 2001	Palomar	NEAT	(2076)	1.6 km	MPC · JPL
190723	2001 OL_{61}	—	July 21, 2001	Haleakala	NEAT	V	970 m	MPC · JPL
190724	2001 OQ_{64}	—	July 27, 2001	Palomar	NEAT	·	940 m	MPC · JPL
190725	2001 OO_{72}	—	July 21, 2001	Anderson Mesa	LONEOS	·	2.6 km	MPC · JPL
190726	2001 OC_{95}	—	July 29, 2001	Palomar	NEAT	·	2.4 km	MPC · JPL
190727	2001 OP_{97}	—	July 25, 2001	Haleakala	NEAT	·	1.7 km	MPC · JPL
190728	2001 OL_{98}	—	July 25, 2001	Haleakala	NEAT	·	710 m	MPC · JPL
190729	2001 PD_{3}	—	August 3, 2001	Haleakala	NEAT	·	1.5 km	MPC · JPL
190730 Lorenzonesi	2001 PY_{13}	Lorenzonesi	August 13, 2001	San Marcello	M. Tombelli, A. Boattini	·	1.2 km	MPC · JPL
190731	2001 PW_{14}	—	August 15, 2001	Badlands	Dyvig, R.	·	1.4 km	MPC · JPL
190732	2001 PJ_{17}	—	August 9, 2001	Palomar	NEAT	PHO	1.2 km	MPC · JPL
190733	2001 PE_{22}	—	August 10, 2001	Haleakala	NEAT	V	1.0 km	MPC · JPL
190734	2001 PP_{23}	—	August 11, 2001	Haleakala	NEAT	(2076)	1.2 km	MPC · JPL
190735	2001 PP_{29}	—	August 11, 2001	Socorro	LINEAR	PHO	1.5 km	MPC · JPL
190736	2001 PM_{43}	—	August 13, 2001	Haleakala	NEAT	PHO	1.7 km	MPC · JPL
190737	2001 PD_{51}	—	August 1, 2001	Palomar	NEAT	·	1.1 km	MPC · JPL
190738	2001 PR_{53}	—	August 14, 2001	Palomar	NEAT	BAP	1.4 km	MPC · JPL
190739	2001 PL_{60}	—	August 13, 2001	Haleakala	NEAT	·	1.0 km	MPC · JPL
190740	2001 PX_{60}	—	August 13, 2001	Haleakala	NEAT	BAP	1.1 km	MPC · JPL
190741	2001 QJ_{1}	—	August 16, 2001	Socorro	LINEAR	·	1.1 km	MPC · JPL
190742	2001 QH_{6}	—	August 16, 2001	Socorro	LINEAR	·	1.1 km	MPC · JPL
190743	2001 QW_{6}	—	August 16, 2001	Socorro	LINEAR	·	1.3 km	MPC · JPL
190744	2001 QE_{7}	—	August 16, 2001	Socorro	LINEAR	·	1.1 km	MPC · JPL
190745	2001 QZ_{8}	—	August 16, 2001	Socorro	LINEAR	·	990 m	MPC · JPL
190746	2001 QD_{15}	—	August 16, 2001	Socorro	LINEAR	·	1.4 km	MPC · JPL
190747	2001 QW_{36}	—	August 16, 2001	Socorro	LINEAR	·	1.3 km	MPC · JPL
190748	2001 QZ_{36}	—	August 16, 2001	Socorro	LINEAR	·	1.3 km	MPC · JPL
190749	2001 QT_{43}	—	August 16, 2001	Socorro	LINEAR	·	730 m	MPC · JPL
190750	2001 QE_{54}	—	August 16, 2001	Socorro	LINEAR	·	1.2 km	MPC · JPL
190751	2001 QM_{58}	—	August 16, 2001	Socorro	LINEAR	·	1.2 km	MPC · JPL
190752	2001 QR_{61}	—	August 16, 2001	Socorro	LINEAR	·	1.3 km	MPC · JPL
190753	2001 QF_{62}	—	August 16, 2001	Socorro	LINEAR	V	1.1 km	MPC · JPL
190754	2001 QL_{79}	—	August 16, 2001	Socorro	LINEAR	·	1.4 km	MPC · JPL
190755	2001 QS_{83}	—	August 17, 2001	Socorro	LINEAR	·	2.1 km	MPC · JPL
190756	2001 QO_{93}	—	August 22, 2001	Socorro	LINEAR	·	3.1 km	MPC · JPL
190757	2001 QT_{93}	—	August 22, 2001	Socorro	LINEAR	·	1.9 km	MPC · JPL
190758	2001 QH_{96}	—	August 22, 2001	Socorro	LINEAR	AMO	740 m	MPC · JPL
190759	2001 QC_{112}	—	August 24, 2001	Socorro	LINEAR	·	2.6 km	MPC · JPL
190760	2001 QG_{116}	—	August 17, 2001	Socorro	LINEAR	V	1.1 km	MPC · JPL
190761	2001 QX_{130}	—	August 20, 2001	Socorro	LINEAR	V	810 m	MPC · JPL
190762	2001 QO_{134}	—	August 22, 2001	Socorro	LINEAR	·	1.7 km	MPC · JPL
190763	2001 QU_{135}	—	August 22, 2001	Socorro	LINEAR	·	2.3 km	MPC · JPL
190764	2001 QN_{137}	—	August 22, 2001	Socorro	LINEAR	·	2.1 km	MPC · JPL
190765	2001 QE_{150}	—	August 25, 2001	Palomar	NEAT	·	2.1 km	MPC · JPL
190766	2001 QU_{154}	—	August 23, 2001	Anderson Mesa	LONEOS	(2076)	1.0 km	MPC · JPL
190767	2001 QV_{158}	—	August 23, 2001	Anderson Mesa	LONEOS	·	1.2 km	MPC · JPL
190768	2001 QV_{167}	—	August 24, 2001	Haleakala	NEAT	·	1.2 km	MPC · JPL
190769	2001 QJ_{196}	—	August 22, 2001	Socorro	LINEAR	·	1.6 km	MPC · JPL
190770	2001 QA_{205}	—	August 23, 2001	Anderson Mesa	LONEOS	·	1.2 km	MPC · JPL
190771	2001 QZ_{207}	—	August 23, 2001	Anderson Mesa	LONEOS	·	1.4 km	MPC · JPL
190772	2001 QJ_{222}	—	August 24, 2001	Anderson Mesa	LONEOS	·	2.0 km	MPC · JPL
190773	2001 QL_{236}	—	August 24, 2001	Socorro	LINEAR	·	1.2 km	MPC · JPL
190774	2001 QL_{240}	—	August 24, 2001	Socorro	LINEAR	·	1.1 km	MPC · JPL
190775	2001 QK_{241}	—	August 24, 2001	Socorro	LINEAR	·	1.7 km	MPC · JPL
190776	2001 QY_{247}	—	August 24, 2001	Socorro	LINEAR	·	1.0 km	MPC · JPL
190777	2001 QK_{249}	—	August 24, 2001	Socorro	LINEAR	·	1.0 km	MPC · JPL
190778	2001 QD_{260}	—	August 25, 2001	Socorro	LINEAR	·	1.8 km	MPC · JPL
190779	2001 QL_{276}	—	August 19, 2001	Socorro	LINEAR	·	1.8 km	MPC · JPL
190780	2001 QA_{279}	—	August 19, 2001	Socorro	LINEAR	·	1.8 km	MPC · JPL
190781	2001 QO_{285}	—	August 23, 2001	Haleakala	NEAT	·	970 m	MPC · JPL
190782	2001 QT_{285}	—	August 23, 2001	Haleakala	NEAT	·	1.4 km	MPC · JPL
190783	2001 QG_{290}	—	August 16, 2001	Socorro	LINEAR	·	1.5 km	MPC · JPL
190784	2001 QL_{294}	—	August 24, 2001	Anderson Mesa	LONEOS	NYS	1.1 km	MPC · JPL
190785	2001 RB_{5}	—	September 8, 2001	Socorro	LINEAR	·	1.9 km	MPC · JPL
190786	2001 RL_{7}	—	September 7, 2001	Socorro	LINEAR	·	1.3 km	MPC · JPL
190787	2001 RR_{13}	—	September 10, 2001	Socorro	LINEAR	·	1.6 km	MPC · JPL
190788	2001 RT_{17}	—	September 11, 2001	Socorro	LINEAR	APO	760 m	MPC · JPL
190789	2001 RE_{19}	—	September 7, 2001	Socorro	LINEAR	·	1.3 km	MPC · JPL
190790	2001 RQ_{20}	—	September 7, 2001	Socorro	LINEAR	·	1.3 km	MPC · JPL
190791	2001 RF_{26}	—	September 7, 2001	Socorro	LINEAR	·	1.4 km	MPC · JPL
190792	2001 RZ_{26}	—	September 7, 2001	Socorro	LINEAR	V	1.0 km	MPC · JPL
190793	2001 RX_{28}	—	September 7, 2001	Socorro	LINEAR	·	1.1 km	MPC · JPL
190794	2001 RS_{30}	—	September 7, 2001	Socorro	LINEAR	·	1.6 km	MPC · JPL
190795	2001 RQ_{40}	—	September 11, 2001	Socorro	LINEAR	V	1.2 km	MPC · JPL
190796	2001 RZ_{43}	—	September 9, 2001	Palomar	NEAT	·	1.6 km	MPC · JPL
190797	2001 RA_{45}	—	September 9, 2001	Palomar	NEAT	·	1.7 km	MPC · JPL
190798	2001 RT_{45}	—	September 14, 2001	Palomar	NEAT	·	1.9 km	MPC · JPL
190799	2001 RE_{67}	—	September 10, 2001	Socorro	LINEAR	·	1.8 km	MPC · JPL
190800	2001 RT_{68}	—	September 10, 2001	Socorro	LINEAR	V	1.4 km	MPC · JPL

== 190801–190900 ==
back to top

Designation			Discovery			Properties		Ref
Permanent	Provisional	Named after	Date	Site	Discoverer(s)	Category	Diam.	Ref
190801	2001 RF_{70}	—	September 10, 2001	Socorro	LINEAR	·	1.8 km	MPC · JPL
190802	2001 RB_{79}	—	September 10, 2001	Socorro	LINEAR	·	1.9 km	MPC · JPL
190803	2001 RA_{86}	—	September 11, 2001	Anderson Mesa	LONEOS	·	960 m	MPC · JPL
190804	2001 RM_{86}	—	September 11, 2001	Anderson Mesa	LONEOS	·	1.7 km	MPC · JPL
190805	2001 RJ_{90}	—	September 11, 2001	Anderson Mesa	LONEOS	·	1.6 km	MPC · JPL
190806	2001 RL_{93}	—	September 11, 2001	Anderson Mesa	LONEOS	·	1.2 km	MPC · JPL
190807	2001 RY_{95}	—	September 11, 2001	Kitt Peak	Spacewatch	·	1.3 km	MPC · JPL
190808	2001 RJ_{101}	—	September 12, 2001	Socorro	LINEAR	·	1.3 km	MPC · JPL
190809	2001 RY_{104}	—	September 12, 2001	Socorro	LINEAR	·	1.6 km	MPC · JPL
190810	2001 RE_{111}	—	September 12, 2001	Socorro	LINEAR	·	1.5 km	MPC · JPL
190811	2001 RM_{113}	—	September 12, 2001	Socorro	LINEAR	·	1.4 km	MPC · JPL
190812	2001 RU_{114}	—	September 12, 2001	Socorro	LINEAR	·	1.5 km	MPC · JPL
190813	2001 RZ_{122}	—	September 12, 2001	Socorro	LINEAR	·	1.2 km	MPC · JPL
190814	2001 RZ_{125}	—	September 12, 2001	Socorro	LINEAR	·	1.2 km	MPC · JPL
190815	2001 RU_{135}	—	September 12, 2001	Socorro	LINEAR	·	1.5 km	MPC · JPL
190816	2001 RO_{142}	—	September 10, 2001	Palomar	NEAT	·	1.4 km	MPC · JPL
190817	2001 RC_{155}	—	September 12, 2001	Socorro	LINEAR	·	1.8 km	MPC · JPL
190818	2001 SR_{2}	—	September 17, 2001	Desert Eagle	W. K. Y. Yeung	·	1.3 km	MPC · JPL
190819	2001 SP_{14}	—	September 16, 2001	Socorro	LINEAR	·	1.2 km	MPC · JPL
190820	2001 SY_{14}	—	September 16, 2001	Socorro	LINEAR	·	1.2 km	MPC · JPL
190821	2001 SJ_{16}	—	September 16, 2001	Socorro	LINEAR	·	750 m	MPC · JPL
190822	2001 SE_{22}	—	September 16, 2001	Socorro	LINEAR	·	1.8 km	MPC · JPL
190823	2001 ST_{22}	—	September 16, 2001	Socorro	LINEAR	NYS	1.6 km	MPC · JPL
190824	2001 SD_{23}	—	September 16, 2001	Socorro	LINEAR	·	1.5 km	MPC · JPL
190825	2001 SL_{24}	—	September 16, 2001	Socorro	LINEAR	·	1.1 km	MPC · JPL
190826	2001 SH_{34}	—	September 16, 2001	Socorro	LINEAR	·	1.5 km	MPC · JPL
190827	2001 SJ_{39}	—	September 16, 2001	Socorro	LINEAR	·	1.4 km	MPC · JPL
190828	2001 SJ_{47}	—	September 16, 2001	Socorro	LINEAR	·	1.2 km	MPC · JPL
190829	2001 SK_{48}	—	September 16, 2001	Socorro	LINEAR	·	2.6 km	MPC · JPL
190830	2001 SZ_{56}	—	September 16, 2001	Socorro	LINEAR	·	1.8 km	MPC · JPL
190831	2001 SX_{65}	—	September 17, 2001	Socorro	LINEAR	·	2.1 km	MPC · JPL
190832	2001 SX_{67}	—	September 17, 2001	Socorro	LINEAR	·	2.0 km	MPC · JPL
190833	2001 SY_{71}	—	September 17, 2001	Socorro	LINEAR	NYS	1.6 km	MPC · JPL
190834	2001 SD_{72}	—	September 17, 2001	Socorro	LINEAR	·	1.9 km	MPC · JPL
190835	2001 SD_{75}	—	September 19, 2001	Anderson Mesa	LONEOS	·	1.9 km	MPC · JPL
190836	2001 SP_{80}	—	September 20, 2001	Socorro	LINEAR	·	990 m	MPC · JPL
190837	2001 ST_{90}	—	September 20, 2001	Socorro	LINEAR	·	1.2 km	MPC · JPL
190838	2001 SE_{101}	—	September 20, 2001	Socorro	LINEAR	·	1.9 km	MPC · JPL
190839	2001 SE_{104}	—	September 20, 2001	Socorro	LINEAR	·	1.2 km	MPC · JPL
190840	2001 SA_{105}	—	September 20, 2001	Socorro	LINEAR	·	1.5 km	MPC · JPL
190841	2001 SO_{105}	—	September 20, 2001	Socorro	LINEAR	·	2.6 km	MPC · JPL
190842	2001 SS_{106}	—	September 20, 2001	Socorro	LINEAR	V	1.3 km	MPC · JPL
190843	2001 SM_{114}	—	September 20, 2001	Desert Eagle	W. K. Y. Yeung	·	1.6 km	MPC · JPL
190844	2001 ST_{123}	—	September 16, 2001	Socorro	LINEAR	NYS	1.0 km	MPC · JPL
190845	2001 SY_{130}	—	September 16, 2001	Socorro	LINEAR	·	1.1 km	MPC · JPL
190846	2001 SP_{132}	—	September 16, 2001	Socorro	LINEAR	NYS	1.2 km	MPC · JPL
190847	2001 SX_{136}	—	September 16, 2001	Socorro	LINEAR	NYS	1.3 km	MPC · JPL
190848	2001 SS_{143}	—	September 16, 2001	Socorro	LINEAR	·	1.4 km	MPC · JPL
190849	2001 SS_{153}	—	September 17, 2001	Socorro	LINEAR	NYS	1.7 km	MPC · JPL
190850	2001 SL_{161}	—	September 17, 2001	Socorro	LINEAR	·	2.1 km	MPC · JPL
190851	2001 SR_{172}	—	September 16, 2001	Socorro	LINEAR	·	1.2 km	MPC · JPL
190852	2001 SB_{188}	—	September 19, 2001	Socorro	LINEAR	(2076)	1.1 km	MPC · JPL
190853	2001 SB_{194}	—	September 19, 2001	Socorro	LINEAR	·	1.2 km	MPC · JPL
190854	2001 SQ_{200}	—	September 19, 2001	Socorro	LINEAR	MAS	1.1 km	MPC · JPL
190855	2001 SA_{204}	—	September 19, 2001	Socorro	LINEAR	NYS	1.2 km	MPC · JPL
190856	2001 SZ_{231}	—	September 19, 2001	Socorro	LINEAR	·	1.8 km	MPC · JPL
190857	2001 SW_{265}	—	September 25, 2001	Desert Eagle	W. K. Y. Yeung	·	2.3 km	MPC · JPL
190858	2001 SP_{271}	—	September 20, 2001	Socorro	LINEAR	·	1.5 km	MPC · JPL
190859	2001 SE_{278}	—	September 21, 2001	Anderson Mesa	LONEOS	·	1.9 km	MPC · JPL
190860	2001 SZ_{278}	—	September 21, 2001	Anderson Mesa	LONEOS	ERI	2.5 km	MPC · JPL
190861	2001 SC_{280}	—	September 21, 2001	Anderson Mesa	LONEOS	·	1.9 km	MPC · JPL
190862	2001 SK_{280}	—	September 21, 2001	Anderson Mesa	LONEOS	·	2.1 km	MPC · JPL
190863	2001 SS_{280}	—	September 21, 2001	Anderson Mesa	LONEOS	MAS	1.3 km	MPC · JPL
190864	2001 SE_{326}	—	September 17, 2001	Kitt Peak	Spacewatch	·	1.9 km	MPC · JPL
190865	2001 TA_{19}	—	October 10, 2001	Palomar	NEAT	·	1.3 km	MPC · JPL
190866	2001 TX_{45}	—	October 9, 2001	Kitt Peak	Spacewatch	·	1.7 km	MPC · JPL
190867	2001 TT_{48}	—	October 14, 2001	Socorro	LINEAR	PHO	1.7 km	MPC · JPL
190868	2001 TF_{50}	—	October 13, 2001	Socorro	LINEAR	·	1.6 km	MPC · JPL
190869	2001 TB_{56}	—	October 15, 2001	Socorro	LINEAR	NYS	1.4 km	MPC · JPL
190870	2001 TA_{68}	—	October 13, 2001	Socorro	LINEAR	·	2.3 km	MPC · JPL
190871	2001 TK_{74}	—	October 13, 2001	Socorro	LINEAR	NYS	1.4 km	MPC · JPL
190872	2001 TL_{82}	—	October 14, 2001	Socorro	LINEAR	·	2.1 km	MPC · JPL
190873	2001 TQ_{86}	—	October 14, 2001	Socorro	LINEAR	·	2.1 km	MPC · JPL
190874	2001 TR_{96}	—	October 14, 2001	Socorro	LINEAR	·	1.7 km	MPC · JPL
190875	2001 TR_{113}	—	October 14, 2001	Socorro	LINEAR	·	2.3 km	MPC · JPL
190876	2001 TW_{113}	—	October 14, 2001	Socorro	LINEAR	·	2.1 km	MPC · JPL
190877	2001 TW_{130}	—	October 10, 2001	Palomar	NEAT	V	940 m	MPC · JPL
190878	2001 TY_{134}	—	October 13, 2001	Palomar	NEAT	·	1.5 km	MPC · JPL
190879	2001 TK_{136}	—	October 14, 2001	Palomar	NEAT	·	1.9 km	MPC · JPL
190880	2001 TH_{162}	—	October 11, 2001	Palomar	NEAT	·	2.0 km	MPC · JPL
190881	2001 TF_{168}	—	October 15, 2001	Socorro	LINEAR	V	1.5 km	MPC · JPL
190882	2001 TT_{169}	—	October 15, 2001	Socorro	LINEAR	PHO	1.9 km	MPC · JPL
190883	2001 TT_{183}	—	October 14, 2001	Socorro	LINEAR	·	1.7 km	MPC · JPL
190884	2001 TT_{184}	—	October 14, 2001	Socorro	LINEAR	·	1.7 km	MPC · JPL
190885	2001 TQ_{189}	—	October 14, 2001	Socorro	LINEAR	ERI	2.6 km	MPC · JPL
190886	2001 TD_{201}	—	October 11, 2001	Socorro	LINEAR	V	1.3 km	MPC · JPL
190887	2001 TB_{212}	—	October 13, 2001	Socorro	LINEAR	MAS	1.1 km	MPC · JPL
190888	2001 TO_{216}	—	October 13, 2001	Palomar	NEAT	V	1.1 km	MPC · JPL
190889	2001 TA_{219}	—	October 14, 2001	Anderson Mesa	LONEOS	·	2.1 km	MPC · JPL
190890	2001 TB_{241}	—	October 15, 2001	Socorro	LINEAR	·	2.1 km	MPC · JPL
190891	2001 UU_{1}	—	October 16, 2001	Socorro	LINEAR	PHO	3.1 km	MPC · JPL
190892	2001 UA_{4}	—	October 17, 2001	Desert Eagle	W. K. Y. Yeung	·	1.6 km	MPC · JPL
190893	2001 UW_{5}	—	October 21, 2001	Desert Eagle	W. K. Y. Yeung	·	3.0 km	MPC · JPL
190894	2001 UW_{8}	—	October 17, 2001	Socorro	LINEAR	V	930 m	MPC · JPL
190895	2001 UO_{9}	—	October 17, 2001	Socorro	LINEAR	·	1.8 km	MPC · JPL
190896	2001 UG_{21}	—	October 17, 2001	Socorro	LINEAR	V	1.4 km	MPC · JPL
190897	2001 UH_{24}	—	October 18, 2001	Socorro	LINEAR	·	1.8 km	MPC · JPL
190898	2001 UH_{31}	—	October 16, 2001	Socorro	LINEAR	·	2.0 km	MPC · JPL
190899	2001 UO_{40}	—	October 17, 2001	Socorro	LINEAR	MAS	960 m	MPC · JPL
190900	2001 UW_{44}	—	October 17, 2001	Socorro	LINEAR	NYS	1.5 km	MPC · JPL

== 190901–191000 ==
back to top

Designation			Discovery			Properties		Ref
Permanent	Provisional	Named after	Date	Site	Discoverer(s)	Category	Diam.	Ref
190901	2001 UX_{54}	—	October 16, 2001	Socorro	LINEAR	V	1.0 km	MPC · JPL
190902	2001 UC_{60}	—	October 17, 2001	Socorro	LINEAR	·	2.9 km	MPC · JPL
190903	2001 UN_{73}	—	October 17, 2001	Socorro	LINEAR	NYS	1.6 km	MPC · JPL
190904	2001 UQ_{78}	—	October 20, 2001	Socorro	LINEAR	·	1.6 km	MPC · JPL
190905	2001 UX_{78}	—	October 20, 2001	Socorro	LINEAR	·	1.4 km	MPC · JPL
190906	2001 UN_{83}	—	October 20, 2001	Socorro	LINEAR	·	1.4 km	MPC · JPL
190907	2001 UD_{87}	—	October 18, 2001	Kitt Peak	Spacewatch	·	2.0 km	MPC · JPL
190908	2001 US_{91}	—	October 18, 2001	Palomar	NEAT	V	1.0 km	MPC · JPL
190909	2001 UT_{98}	—	October 17, 2001	Socorro	LINEAR	·	1.2 km	MPC · JPL
190910	2001 UC_{105}	—	October 20, 2001	Socorro	LINEAR	·	1.5 km	MPC · JPL
190911	2001 UR_{113}	—	October 22, 2001	Socorro	LINEAR	V	850 m	MPC · JPL
190912	2001 UW_{113}	—	October 22, 2001	Socorro	LINEAR	MAS	1.1 km	MPC · JPL
190913	2001 UQ_{118}	—	October 22, 2001	Socorro	LINEAR	·	2.1 km	MPC · JPL
190914	2001 UG_{119}	—	October 22, 2001	Socorro	LINEAR	·	1.5 km	MPC · JPL
190915	2001 UO_{119}	—	October 22, 2001	Socorro	LINEAR	·	1.7 km	MPC · JPL
190916	2001 UD_{123}	—	October 22, 2001	Socorro	LINEAR	V	1.2 km	MPC · JPL
190917	2001 US_{126}	—	October 17, 2001	Socorro	LINEAR	MAS	1.3 km	MPC · JPL
190918	2001 UD_{139}	—	October 23, 2001	Socorro	LINEAR	·	2.6 km	MPC · JPL
190919	2001 UP_{142}	—	October 23, 2001	Socorro	LINEAR	NYS	1.9 km	MPC · JPL
190920	2001 UU_{144}	—	October 23, 2001	Socorro	LINEAR	·	1.2 km	MPC · JPL
190921	2001 UT_{151}	—	October 23, 2001	Socorro	LINEAR	MAS	1.1 km	MPC · JPL
190922	2001 UC_{154}	—	October 23, 2001	Socorro	LINEAR	·	1.5 km	MPC · JPL
190923	2001 UD_{158}	—	October 23, 2001	Socorro	LINEAR	MAS	1.1 km	MPC · JPL
190924	2001 UW_{158}	—	October 23, 2001	Socorro	LINEAR	NYS	1.5 km	MPC · JPL
190925	2001 UF_{188}	—	October 17, 2001	Socorro	LINEAR	V	1.0 km	MPC · JPL
190926	2001 UK_{197}	—	October 19, 2001	Palomar	NEAT	·	1.4 km	MPC · JPL
190927	2001 US_{206}	—	October 20, 2001	Socorro	LINEAR	·	2.1 km	MPC · JPL
190928	2001 UL_{211}	—	October 21, 2001	Socorro	LINEAR	·	1.7 km	MPC · JPL
190929	2001 VV_{3}	—	November 11, 2001	Kitt Peak	Spacewatch	·	1.9 km	MPC · JPL
190930	2001 VF_{5}	—	November 10, 2001	Bisei SG Center	BATTeRS	NYS	1.9 km	MPC · JPL
190931	2001 VS_{5}	—	November 9, 2001	Socorro	LINEAR	·	1.5 km	MPC · JPL
190932	2001 VX_{6}	—	November 9, 2001	Socorro	LINEAR	·	1.5 km	MPC · JPL
190933	2001 VY_{12}	—	November 10, 2001	Socorro	LINEAR	·	2.5 km	MPC · JPL
190934	2001 VT_{18}	—	November 9, 2001	Socorro	LINEAR	·	2.0 km	MPC · JPL
190935	2001 VH_{22}	—	November 9, 2001	Socorro	LINEAR	NYS	1.8 km	MPC · JPL
190936	2001 VZ_{25}	—	November 9, 2001	Socorro	LINEAR	NYS	1.9 km	MPC · JPL
190937	2001 VT_{29}	—	November 9, 2001	Socorro	LINEAR	·	1.9 km	MPC · JPL
190938	2001 VA_{32}	—	November 9, 2001	Socorro	LINEAR	MAS	1.1 km	MPC · JPL
190939	2001 VD_{33}	—	November 9, 2001	Socorro	LINEAR	·	1.9 km	MPC · JPL
190940	2001 VF_{36}	—	November 9, 2001	Socorro	LINEAR	V	1.5 km	MPC · JPL
190941	2001 VA_{39}	—	November 9, 2001	Socorro	LINEAR	·	2.9 km	MPC · JPL
190942	2001 VP_{40}	—	November 9, 2001	Socorro	LINEAR	NYS	1.8 km	MPC · JPL
190943	2001 VB_{41}	—	November 9, 2001	Socorro	LINEAR	MAS	1.0 km	MPC · JPL
190944	2001 VH_{45}	—	November 9, 2001	Socorro	LINEAR	·	2.8 km	MPC · JPL
190945	2001 VC_{47}	—	November 9, 2001	Socorro	LINEAR	·	3.5 km	MPC · JPL
190946	2001 VS_{49}	—	November 10, 2001	Socorro	LINEAR	·	1.7 km	MPC · JPL
190947	2001 VK_{52}	—	November 10, 2001	Socorro	LINEAR	·	1.4 km	MPC · JPL
190948	2001 VT_{55}	—	November 10, 2001	Socorro	LINEAR	·	2.1 km	MPC · JPL
190949	2001 VL_{59}	—	November 10, 2001	Socorro	LINEAR	·	1.3 km	MPC · JPL
190950	2001 VM_{62}	—	November 10, 2001	Socorro	LINEAR	·	1.9 km	MPC · JPL
190951	2001 VU_{62}	—	November 10, 2001	Socorro	LINEAR	·	1.7 km	MPC · JPL
190952	2001 VV_{63}	—	November 10, 2001	Socorro	LINEAR	NYS ·	3.4 km	MPC · JPL
190953	2001 VD_{114}	—	November 12, 2001	Socorro	LINEAR	·	1.4 km	MPC · JPL
190954	2001 VZ_{114}	—	November 12, 2001	Socorro	LINEAR	·	1.7 km	MPC · JPL
190955	2001 VU_{118}	—	November 12, 2001	Socorro	LINEAR	·	1.6 km	MPC · JPL
190956	2001 VC_{119}	—	November 12, 2001	Socorro	LINEAR	·	2.1 km	MPC · JPL
190957	2001 VB_{125}	—	November 11, 2001	Socorro	LINEAR	·	1.6 km	MPC · JPL
190958	2001 WZ_{8}	—	November 17, 2001	Socorro	LINEAR	·	2.3 km	MPC · JPL
190959	2001 WX_{9}	—	November 17, 2001	Socorro	LINEAR	·	1.6 km	MPC · JPL
190960	2001 WP_{20}	—	November 17, 2001	Socorro	LINEAR	NYS ·	2.5 km	MPC · JPL
190961	2001 WB_{39}	—	November 17, 2001	Socorro	LINEAR	·	3.0 km	MPC · JPL
190962	2001 WX_{44}	—	November 18, 2001	Socorro	LINEAR	·	1.8 km	MPC · JPL
190963	2001 WD_{48}	—	November 19, 2001	Anderson Mesa	LONEOS	·	2.4 km	MPC · JPL
190964	2001 XC	—	December 2, 2001	Cordell-Lorenz	D. T. Durig	·	4.8 km	MPC · JPL
190965	2001 XF_{5}	—	December 5, 2001	Haleakala	NEAT	·	1.6 km	MPC · JPL
190966	2001 XT_{15}	—	December 10, 2001	Socorro	LINEAR	NYS	1.6 km	MPC · JPL
190967	2001 XW_{33}	—	December 7, 2001	Socorro	LINEAR	MAS	1.2 km	MPC · JPL
190968	2001 XZ_{35}	—	December 9, 2001	Socorro	LINEAR	·	2.6 km	MPC · JPL
190969	2001 XF_{38}	—	December 9, 2001	Socorro	LINEAR	·	3.0 km	MPC · JPL
190970	2001 XS_{41}	—	December 9, 2001	Socorro	LINEAR	·	2.1 km	MPC · JPL
190971	2001 XY_{51}	—	December 10, 2001	Socorro	LINEAR	MAS	1.9 km	MPC · JPL
190972	2001 XD_{63}	—	December 10, 2001	Socorro	LINEAR	V	1.4 km	MPC · JPL
190973	2001 XR_{77}	—	December 11, 2001	Socorro	LINEAR	·	1.1 km	MPC · JPL
190974	2001 XA_{79}	—	December 11, 2001	Socorro	LINEAR	·	1.3 km	MPC · JPL
190975	2001 XQ_{93}	—	December 10, 2001	Socorro	LINEAR	NYS	1.8 km	MPC · JPL
190976	2001 XU_{95}	—	December 10, 2001	Socorro	LINEAR	·	1.6 km	MPC · JPL
190977	2001 XO_{98}	—	December 10, 2001	Socorro	LINEAR	·	2.1 km	MPC · JPL
190978	2001 XD_{101}	—	December 10, 2001	Socorro	LINEAR	·	2.5 km	MPC · JPL
190979	2001 XQ_{144}	—	December 14, 2001	Socorro	LINEAR	·	1.6 km	MPC · JPL
190980	2001 XY_{149}	—	December 14, 2001	Socorro	LINEAR	MAS	1.0 km	MPC · JPL
190981	2001 XQ_{150}	—	December 14, 2001	Socorro	LINEAR	·	1.9 km	MPC · JPL
190982	2001 XL_{151}	—	December 14, 2001	Socorro	LINEAR	V	1.0 km	MPC · JPL
190983	2001 XA_{172}	—	December 14, 2001	Socorro	LINEAR	·	1.6 km	MPC · JPL
190984	2001 XM_{173}	—	December 14, 2001	Socorro	LINEAR	NYS	1.6 km	MPC · JPL
190985	2001 XB_{177}	—	December 14, 2001	Socorro	LINEAR	·	2.0 km	MPC · JPL
190986	2001 XR_{189}	—	December 14, 2001	Socorro	LINEAR	·	1.8 km	MPC · JPL
190987	2001 XG_{203}	—	December 11, 2001	Socorro	LINEAR	·	1.9 km	MPC · JPL
190988	2001 XD_{215}	—	December 13, 2001	Socorro	LINEAR	·	1.9 km	MPC · JPL
190989	2001 XC_{223}	—	December 15, 2001	Socorro	LINEAR	·	1.8 km	MPC · JPL
190990	2001 XL_{223}	—	December 15, 2001	Socorro	LINEAR	·	2.3 km	MPC · JPL
190991	2001 XQ_{238}	—	December 15, 2001	Socorro	LINEAR	·	2.8 km	MPC · JPL
190992	2001 XH_{239}	—	December 15, 2001	Socorro	LINEAR	NYS	2.1 km	MPC · JPL
190993	2001 XO_{241}	—	December 14, 2001	Socorro	LINEAR	MAS	940 m	MPC · JPL
190994	2001 XN_{249}	—	December 14, 2001	Socorro	LINEAR	NYS	1.9 km	MPC · JPL
190995	2001 YP	—	December 18, 2001	Oaxaca	Roe, J. M.	EUN	2.0 km	MPC · JPL
190996	2001 YY_{10}	—	December 17, 2001	Socorro	LINEAR	·	1.7 km	MPC · JPL
190997	2001 YD_{15}	—	December 17, 2001	Socorro	LINEAR	MAS	1.0 km	MPC · JPL
190998	2001 YC_{18}	—	December 17, 2001	Socorro	LINEAR	MAR	1.8 km	MPC · JPL
190999	2001 YV_{22}	—	December 18, 2001	Socorro	LINEAR	·	1.7 km	MPC · JPL
191000	2001 YV_{27}	—	December 18, 2001	Socorro	LINEAR	NYS	1.9 km	MPC · JPL

back to top

== See also ==
- Meanings of minor-planet names: 190001–191000
