= Robert Stanton =

Robert or Bob Stanton may refer to:

- Robert Stanton (merchant), member of the British parliament for Penryn, 1824–1826
- Robert L. Stanton (1810–1885), American Presbyterian minister, teacher and president of Miami University, 1868–1871
- Robert Brewster Stanton (1846–1922), United States civil and mining engineer
- Robert Stanton (architect) (1900–1983), American architect
- Robert Stanton (Indiana politician) (1902–?), American dentist and Indiana state legislator
- Kirby Grant (1911–1985), American film actor who appeared under the name "Robert Stanton" in the early 1940s
- Bob Haymes (1923–1989), American songwriter, actor and television personality who appeared under the names "Bob Stanton" and "Robert Stanton" in the mid-to-late 1940s
- Robert Stanton (park director) (born 1940), director of the United States National Park Service, 1997–2001
- Bob Stanton (golfer) (born 1946), Australian golfer
- Robert Stanton (actor) (born 1963), American film and television actor
- Robert Stanton (soccer) (born 1972), Australian soccer player of the 1990s–2000s and current coach

== See also ==
- Bob Staton (born c. 1950), American academic administrator
