= Theatre of the Grotesque =

Dramatic movement in 20th century

The Theatre of the Grotesque was a twentieth-century dramatic movement. It is a theatrical style that was developed as a derivative to the late eighteenth-century art movement 'Grotesque' and thus translates the themes and images of the grotesque art into theatrical practices.

'Theatre of the Grotesque' rejects naturalism through surreal comedy, reconciling conventionally conflicting concepts. This style of theatre was popularised globally in the early twentieth century through a strong presence in the Italian theatre scene. 'Theatre of the Grotesque' reached its global peak of prominence in the mid-twentieth century.

Despite not being frequently produced in pure form in contemporary theatre, 'Theatre of the Grotesque' has remained influential in theatre since its inception boasting a clear legacy in both style and practice. Specifically, 'Theatre of the Grotesque' is credited with being the precursor to major contemporary theatrical styles, 'Theatre of the Absurd', and 'Black Comedy'.

== Origin ==
=== Etymological origins ===
The etymological origin of the term grotesque lies in the Italian language. It is the English translation of the word grottesche (meaning unnatural or strange) and was coined to designate certain paintings uncovered in the fifteenth century from Roman times. As these paintings were uncovered from the underground or grotta, the neologism grottesche was adopted to describe them.

=== Artistic origins ===
==== Grotesque art ====
The term Grotesque was popularised during the Renaissance when it was used to describe an antinaturalistic aesthetic in art rather than just the Roman paintings from which the term was derived. This signified the rise of the Grotesque art movement in the late eighteenth century. Retrospectively, both Grotesque art and theatre can be seen throughout the history of humanity. Several instances of traditional art and storytelling have utilised its aesthetic, however, these were not considered or labelled as such until the art movement.

==== Crepescular poetry ====
'Theatre of the Grotesque' is widely considered to be an extension to Crepuscular poetry. Crepuscular poetry, or twilight poetry, rejects both poetic conventions and the socially accepted anthropocentric world view. It strives to undermine human certitudes and does so in a surreal nature. This avant-garde nature, and emphasis on the unusual mirrors that of 'Theatre of the Grotesque', leading scholars to link the emergence of this theatrical style to the existence of Crepuscular poetry.

=== Theatrical origins ===
The first recorded instance of Grotesque as a form of theatre was in 1913 courtesy of playwright Luigi Chiarelli. Chiarelli labelled his play 'The Mask and the Face', written in 1913 and first staged in 1916, as "a Grotesque in Three Acts", thus giving rise to 'Theatre of the Grotesque' as a dramatic style. This style was accepted rapidly in the theatrical world, particularly in Italy, due to the clarification it gave to pre-existing works. The French records of sixteenth-century Italian farces, for example, were clarified as 'Theatre of the Grotesque', as was the dramatic work of prominent literary figure Victor Hugo.

Italian dramatist and academic Luigi Pirandello was also influential in the solidification of 'Theatre of the Grotesque' as a dramatic movement. Many of the comedic conventions of this style have grounds in his conceptualisation of 'umorismo', and his play Six Characters in Search of an Author (1921), is regarded as one of the first major works in this style.

== Theatrical style ==
'Theatre of the Grotesque' is a style that is masked in ambiguity. Its rejection of theatrical and social conventions, and reliance on external influences, such as audience response and reception, means that a stringent definition is difficult to develop. However, being an extension of the Grotesque art movement and Crepuscular poetry, it does have some identifying features.

=== Aesthetic conventions ===
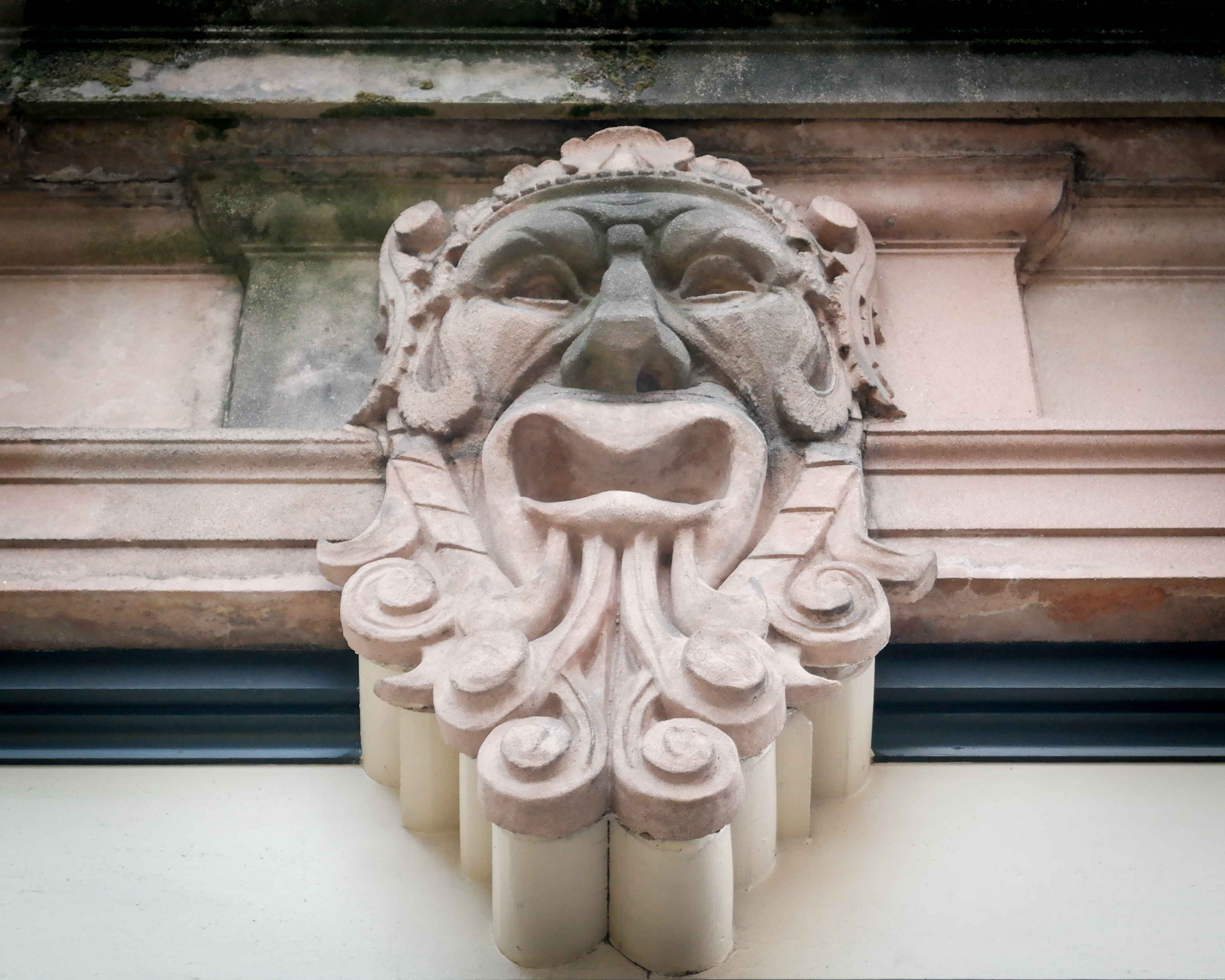
Grotesque face in architecture at the Arlene Schnitzer Concert Hall

'Theatre of the Grotesque' lends itself to the aesthetics of the Grotesque art movement, translating many of its images in both set and costuming. One notable occurrence is the use of makeup or masks to emulate the surreal faces which litter the movement. These faces, with their features being exaggerated in a way that disorients audiences/viewers, are emblematic of the Grotesque aesthetic. Gargoyles were also a prominent visual feature of the first plays in this style, a direct link to the art movement.

As aforementioned, 'Theatre of the Grotesque' is considered an extension of Crepuscular poetry and, thus, they have shared conventions. There is a thematic consistency between the two forms as they both strive to undermine the conventional and the naturalistic in favour of a more subjective perspective on reality. Also, both feature unorthodox language use with the prose of the Crepuscular and the dialogue of the 'Theatre of the Grotesque' featuring the same surreal nature as their content.

=== Thematic conventions ===
One constant feature of 'Theatre of the Grotesque' is that it functions as a point of coalescence of life's contradictions. This theatrical style incongruously mixes the beautiful with the cruel, calling into question what is considered reliable reality. This joining of contradictory concepts encourages a fragmented world view which normalises the horrifying and the ludicrous in place of what is socially accepted. This gives the styles a core instability which defies normative definition and reduces humanity to our savage impulses.

One of the key features of 'Theatre of the Grotesque' is its comedic styling. This dramatic form is often described as a tragic farce as it uses comedy, specifically physical comedy and irony, to frame its existential questioning. The incongruous nature of this theatrical style is absurd and disorienting and so it often occurs that laughter seems the only rational response. This humour is appealing to audiences of 'Theatre of the Grotesque' as it provides a catharsis which liberates audiences from the fear, discomfort, and bewilderment that is experienced in response to the disorienting nature of the content.

=== Psychological conventions ===
A method of defining 'Theatre of the Grotesque' that, conversely to those mentioned above, does not rely on conventions and content, is that proposed by Ralf Remshardt in his book Staging the Savage God. Remshardt proposes that it is the bodily and psychological response of audiences which deems 'Theatre of the Grotesque' such. In this theory, 'Theatre of the Grotesque' is a product of perspective and perception, relying on the audience feeling a disconnect from reality. This provides further complications in defining and identifying the style.

There are three elements or 'syndromes' which feature in Grotesque plays that are essential to harnessing this style. Proposed by Stanley V Longman, these three syndromes, the 'mirror' syndrome, the 'marionette' syndrome, and the 'multiple reality' syndrome, describe the psychological conditions infused into 'Theatre of the Grotesque' plays by authors of the style. The nature of these are captured in the titles of three prominent works in the style; Rosso di San Secondo's Oh Marionetes, What Pasion! (marionette syndrome), Luigi Antonelli's The Man Who Met Himself(mirror syndrome), and Luigi Pirandello's Right You Are (If You Think You Are) (multiple reality syndrome).

== Influential practitioners and works ==
=== Practitioners ===
==== Luigi Chiarelli ====
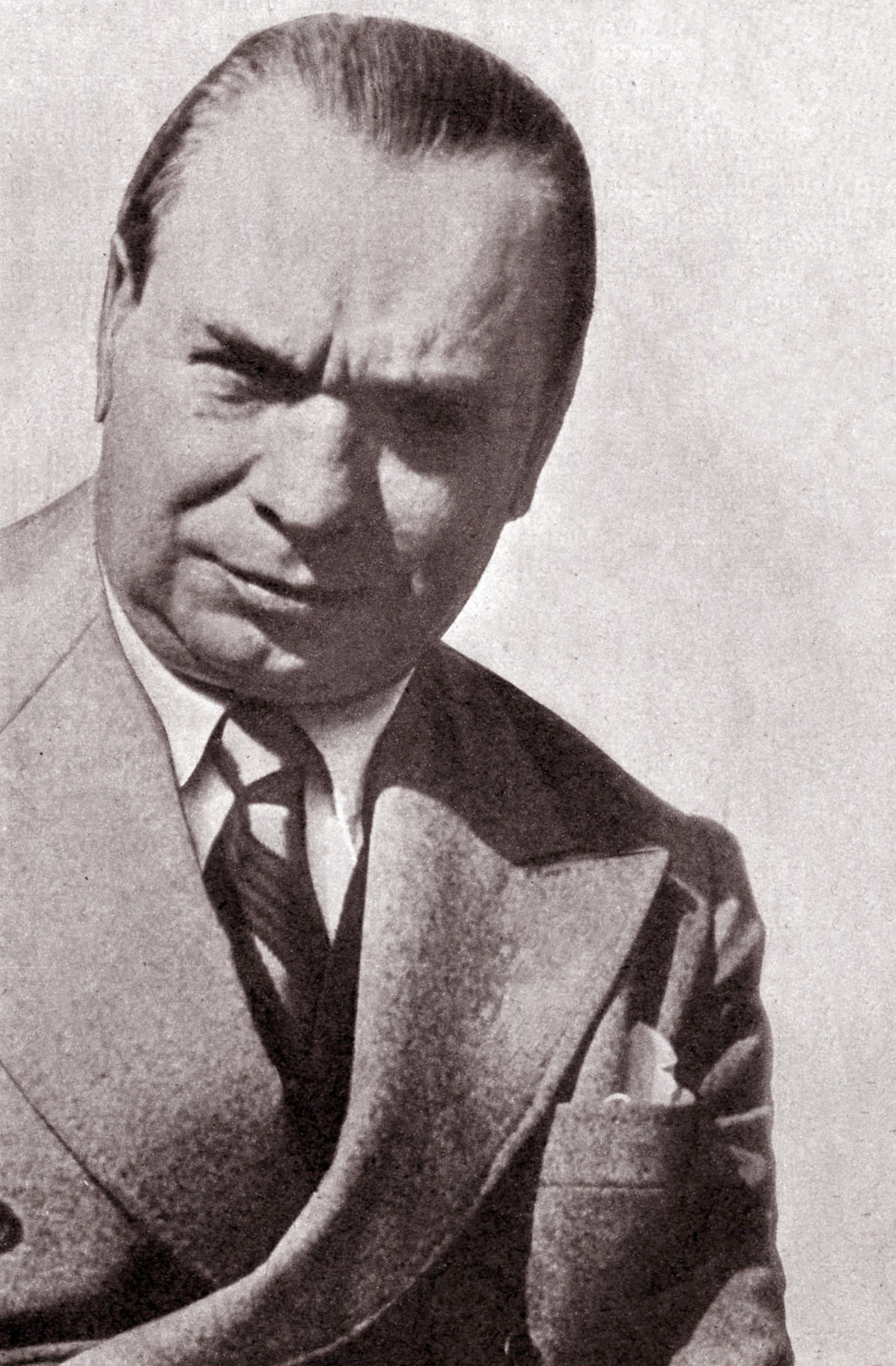
Luigi Chiarelli, 1957

Luigi Chiarelli was an Italian playwright, theatre critic, and author who produced and worked in the early 1900s. He is credited with the creation of Theatre of the Grotesque, a development which defined his career. His 1913 play The Mask and the Face was the first recorded work to be expressly labelled as Theatre of the Grotesque with Chiarelli describing it as "a Grotesque in three parts'. Chiarelli developed Grotesque into a theatrical style, however, his future work did not achieve the same notability in the style as The Mask and the Face. He died in 1947.

==== Luigi Pirandello ====
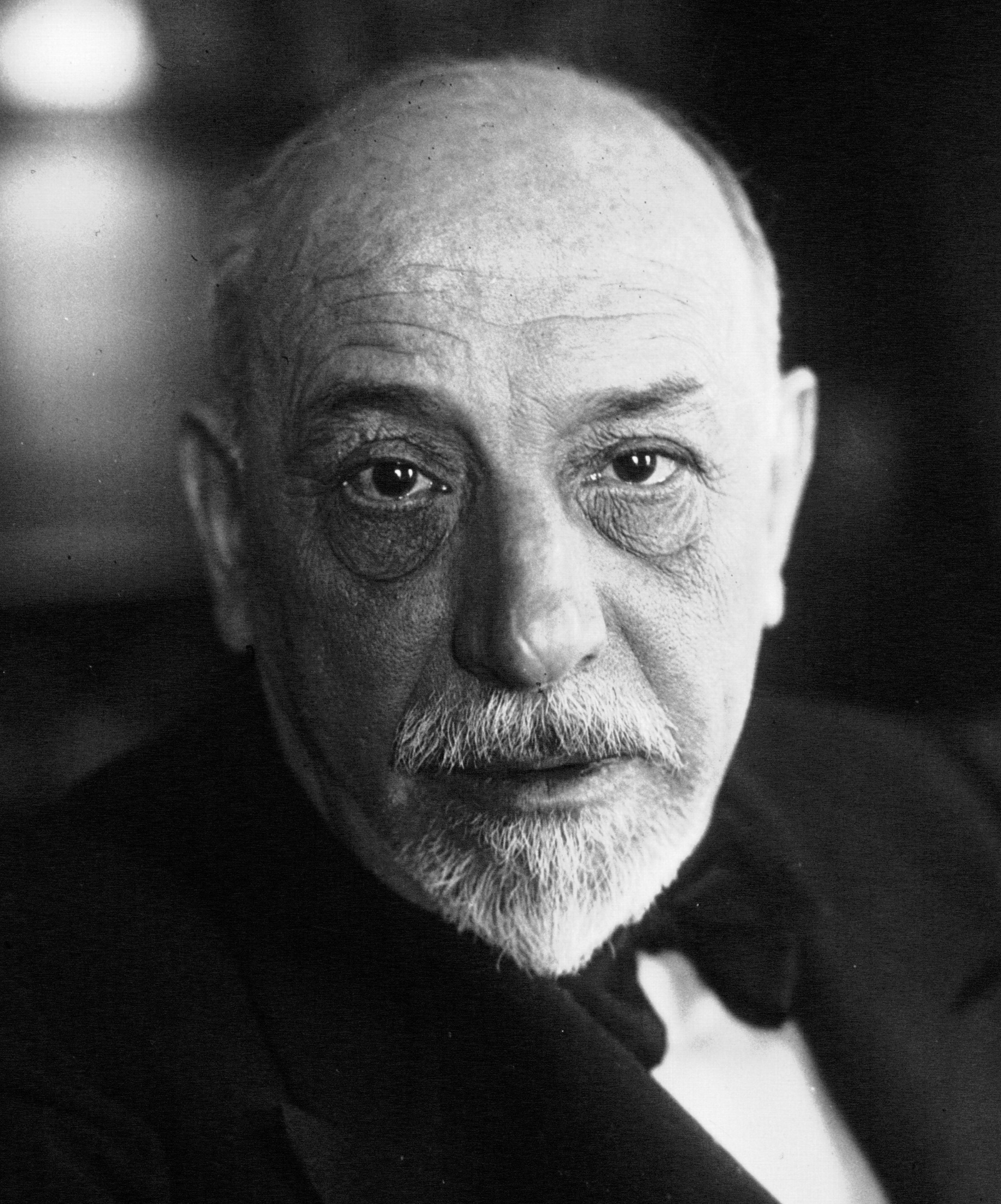
Luigi Pirandello, 1932

Luigi Pirandello, an Italian playwright and author, was a prolific contributor to Theatre of the Grotesque. Pirandello worked during the early-mid 1900s in Italy finding the most success through his plays. His development of the concept of umorismo, concerning laughter in the face of tragedy and pain, was one of the key theoretical informants of Theatre of the Grotesque. Much of his work, especially his plays, rebelled against and criticised the dominance of naturalistic drama in Italy, thus adhering to the conventions of Theatre of the Grotesque. His play Six Characters in Search of an Author, written in 1921, has become one of the most celebrated and mass-produced Theatre of the Grotesque pieces.

==== Friedrich Dürrenmatt ====
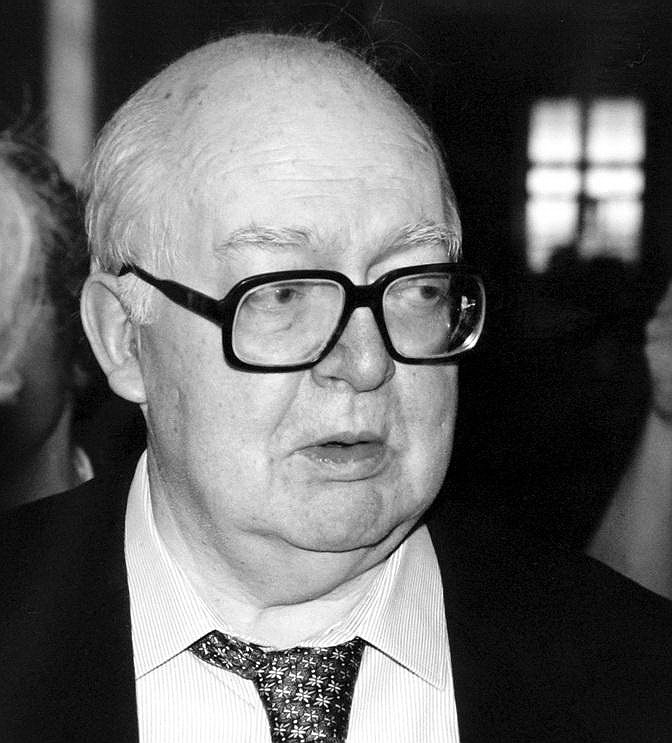
Friedrich Dürrenmatt, 1989

Fredrich Dürrenmatt was a Swiss author, dramatist, and political influencer whose academic and theatrical career was defined by the Grotesque. Both Dürrenmatt's academic and dramatic work centred around the conceptual basis of Theatre of the Grotesque and he is considered the greatest modern theorist in this realm. Dürrenmatt's dramatic works stylistically align with Bertolt Brecht's 'Epic Theatre' but were known for their fusion of the comic and tragic. Dürrenmatt contended that comedy cannot exist in modern theatre without being Grotesque due to the morally ambiguous state of society. It was his belief that nothing existed free of guilt and sin and that only theatrical comedy and Theatre of the Grotesque can give us reprieve.

==== Mikhail Bakhtin ====
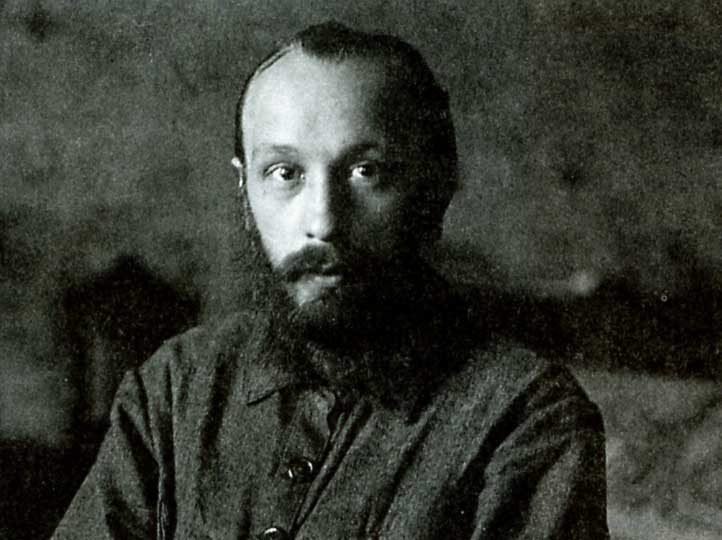
Mikhail Bakhtin, 1920s

Mikhail Bakhtin was a prevalent Russian philosopher, literary critic, semiotician, and academic who developed the concept of Theatre of the Grotesque academically and philosophically. Bakhtin's work on carnivalesque and grotesque realism encouraged detachment from the conventional through an emphasis on the Grotesque bodily experience. These theories were communicated through his 1965 book 'Rabelais and His World' and have become one of the key theoretical explanations of Theatre of the Grotesque. Despite Bakhtin not contributing directly to Theatre of the Grotesque, his philosophical and academic works on the concept have helped to define and give recognition to the style.

=== Works ===
==== The Mask and the Face ====
The Mask and the Face or La Maschera E Il Volto is a comedy of the Grotesque genre written by Italian dramatist Luigi Chiarelli in 1913. The play fuses tragedy with comedy when the protagonist Count Paolo Grazia discovers his wife to be an adulteress after vowing to his friends that he would kill her if she was ever unfaithful, leaving him honour-bound to murder. Chiarelli, aware of the fact that his play did not fit into a particular genre, titled it 'The Mask and the Face: A grotesque in three parts'. This birthed Theatre of the Grotesque as a theatrical movement.

==== Six Characters in Search of an Author ====
Six Characters in Search of an Author is a play written by Luigi Pirandello in 1921 as a reaction against the prevalence of naturalistic drama in Italian theatre. Initially conceived as a novel, it is a metatheatrical play that explores the relationship between authors, their characters, and theatre practitioners that premiered in Rome in 1921 to mixed reviews. Pirandello used this play as a means to examine the infinite absurdities of life, writing in a famous monologue by the Father that "Life is full of grotesque". Following the initial outrage, Six Characters... has been produced to critical acclaim and popular success, transferring to Broadway in 1922 and being adapted into an opera in 1959 and several films, the most notable of which was released in 1964. This play is one of the most celebrated Theatre of the Grotesque plays written in the initial upsurge of the style and was key to its expansion beyond Italy.

==== The Bird of Paradise ====
Written in 1918 by Italian playwright Enrico Cavacchioli, The Bird of Paradise is a Theatre of the Grotesque play which is credited with completing the emergence phase of the style. The Bird of Paradise is commonly considered the most important of Cavacchioli's plays and questions the accepted moral order though introducing an abstract symbolic character named Him, who holds the other characters to trial. This play cemented the presence of Theatre of the Grotesque as a genre, dealing with the themes of anguish and distress, as well as the split between life and art, though comedy and Grotesque conventions.

==== Marionettes, What Passion! ====
Marionettes, What Passion!, a Grotesque play by Italian playwright and journalist Rosso di San Secondo, premiered in 1917 to great popularity and success. The play's plot questions the certainties of life by following three characters that are unable to make sense of their lives and are, eventually revealed to be puppets. This play is the namesake of one of the three Grotesque syndromes, the 'marionette syndrome' which champions themes that question individuals' agency and promotes within their audiences a double consciousness.

== Contemporary Impact ==
=== Theatre of the Absurd ===
Theatre of the Absurd is a theatrical style that emerged post WWII in the 1950s and is a contemporary manifestation of Theatre of the Grotesque. The themes and conventions of this style were influenced by that of Theatre of the Grotesque. Theatre of the Absurd promotes a detachment from reality by emphasising the purposelessness of life in its themes. It is the mid-point of Surrealism and Theatre of the Grotesque, reconciling their ideas through its metaphysical anguish and departure from convention. A specific major influence on this style are the three Grotesque syndromes, all of which are present in Theatre of the Absurd.

=== Black comedy ===
Black comedy otherwise known as, ‘dark humour’ or ‘gallows humour’, is an artistic genre connected to the Grotesque. Popularised through Sigmund Freud's contemplations on the style, Black Comedy emerged in the 1930s. This genre, particularly in its theatrical inceptions, creates comedy from the taboo by using the grotesque, macabre, and inappropriate to elicit laughter from its audiences. Theatre of the Grotesque influenced the incorporation of Black Comedy in theatre through its conventions and blasé treatment of dark themes as well as the psychological response from their audiences. Both styles utilise humour to promote audience detachment from the conventional, a response which was not widely sought after prior to Theatre of the Grotesque's rise.

=== Contemporary presence ===
Following its surge in early-mid 1900s, Theatre of the Grotesque's presence in mainstream theatre has been minimal. There are few notable contemporary works which classify purely as Theatre of the Grotesque; however, its influence can be denoted by the frequent incorporation of its conventions into other theatrical styles and art forms.

==== Grotesque entertainment ====
Grotesque entertainment is a style of cinema and drama which emerged in the 1990s as an extension to Theatre of the Grotesque. This became very successful as a style, especially in cinema, and blended traditional Theatre of the Grotesque with the closely related Black Comedy. Film's such as Quentin Tarantino's Pulp Fiction (1994) and Reservoir Dogs (1992) were examples of this style which received cult status after their positive critical and popular reception. Such works inspired the expansion of and continual engagement with the genre, cementing Theatre of the Grotesque's presence in contemporary drama and film.

==== Martin McDonagh's theatre ====
Martin McDonagh's plays, specifically those engaging with Irish politics, are a modern representation of Theatre of the Grotesque. His plays, the most popular of which is The Lieutenant of Inishmore (2001), can be categorised as ‘In-yer-face theatre’, a style which boasts all of the conventions of Theatre of the Grotesque along with vulgarity and gore. McDonagh's plays, which champion Theatre of the Grotesque, have been theatrically and scholarly influential as contemporary plays.

== See also ==
- Grotesque
- Surrealism
- Theatre of the Absurd
- Black Comedy
- In-Yer-Face
