= Anita Gustafson =

American historian and academic administrator

20th President of Presbyterian College
- Incumbent
- Assumed office August 1, 2023
- Preceded by: Matthew vandenBerg

Personal details
- Born: Anita Ruth Olson; March 3, 1961 (age 65) Fort Lauderdale, Florida, U.S.
- Children: 1
- Education: North Park University (BA); Northwestern University (MA, PhD)

Anita Olson Gustafson (born March 3, 1961) is an American historian and academic administrator who is the 20th and current president of Presbyterian College in Clinton, South Carolina. She took office on August 1, 2023, and was most recently the dean of the College of Liberal Arts and Sciences at Mercer University in Macon, Georgia.

== Early life and education ==
Gustafson was born Anita Ruth Olson on March 3, 1961; she is a native of Fort Lauderdale, Florida. She attended North Park University in Chicago, where she received a Bachelor of Arts degree in economics and Swedish, before earning a Master of Arts and a Ph.D. from Northwestern University in Evanston, Illinois. She was named a Northwestern University Dissertation Fellow in 1988.

== Career ==
Gustafson began teaching history at Presbyterian College in Clinton, South Carolina, in 1997. She was chair of the history department from 2000 to 2004, and was professor of the year in 2007, the same year she received the South Carolina Independent Colleges and Universities Excellence in Teaching Award. She was interim dean of academic programs at Presbyterian from 2005 to 2007 and was interim provost for a two-year stint from 2010 to 2012.

On March 25, 2016, Gustafson was named dean of the Mercer University College of Liberal Arts and Sciences, effective August 1 of that year. She replaced Lake Lambert, who left the job to take the presidency of Hanover University. In addition to leading the college, she taught in the history department.

After Presbyterian College president Matthew vandenBerg announced his intention to step down, the school began a national search that concluded on June 27, 2023, with an announcement that Gustafson would be the school's 20th president, effective August 1, 2023. She is the first female president in the college's history. She was formally inaugurated on April 26, 2024.

=== Work and research ===
Gustafson's work focuses largely on the history of Swedish immigration, particularly into the United States, and Swedish-American communities in the United States. Her manuscript, Swedish Chicago: The Shaping of an Immigrant Community, 1880–1920, was published by Northern Illinois University Press on December 14, 2018.

== Personal life ==
Gustafson and her husband have one son.

Academic offices
Preceded by Matthew vandenBerg	President of Presbyterian College; 2023 — present	Succeeded by Incumbent
Preceded by Lake Lambert	Dean of the Mercer University; College of Liberal Arts and Sciences; 2016 — 2023	Succeeded by Tom Scott
