= Luigi Chiarelli =

Italian playwright (1880–1947)

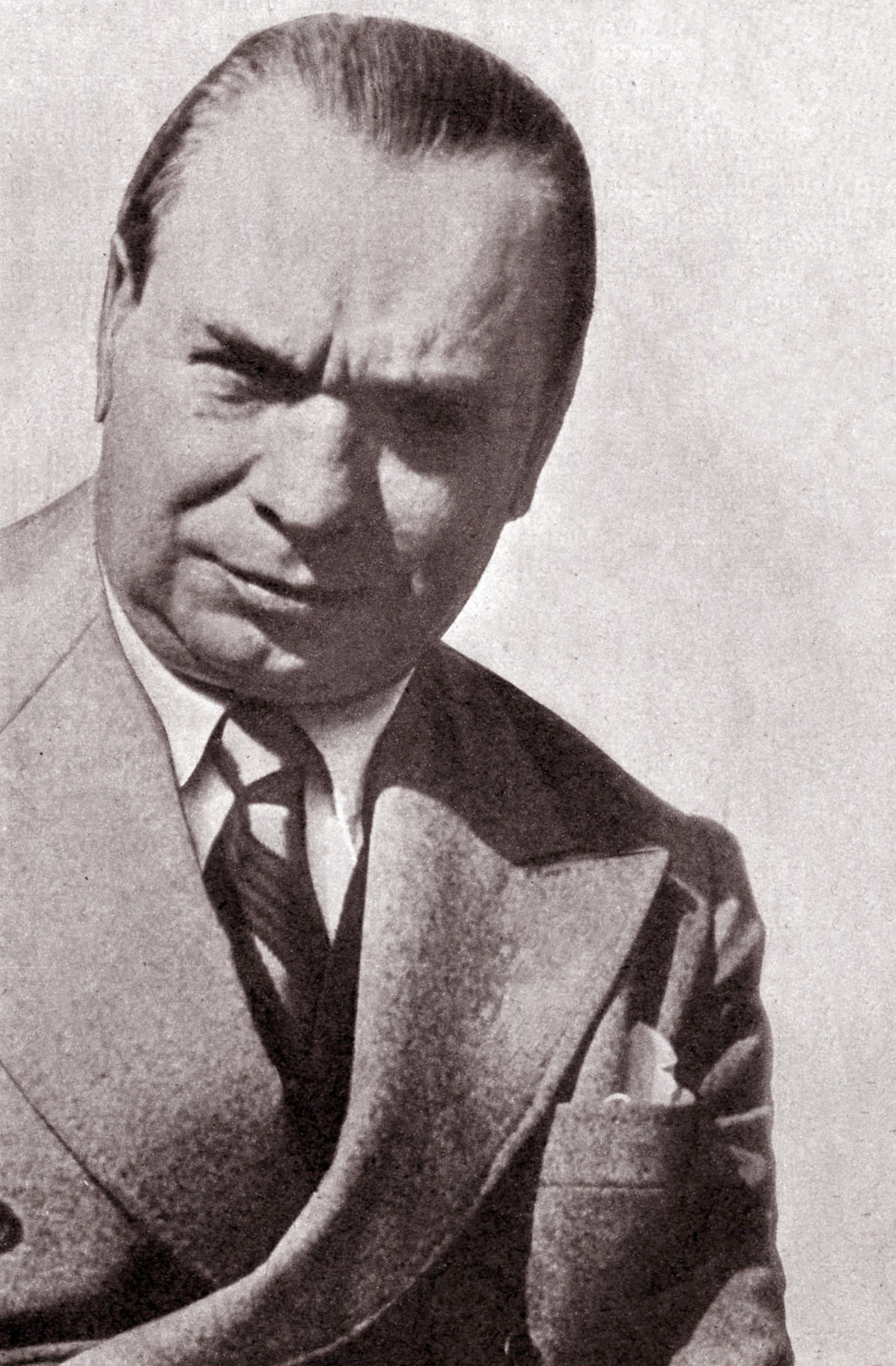

Luigi Chiarelli (7 July 1880 – 20 December 1947) was an Italian playwright, theatre critic, and writer of short stories who is chiefly known as a founder of the teatro grottesco, or Theatre of the Grotesque, after the subtitle of one of his plays.

== Life ==
He was born in 1880 in Trani and attended university, but abandoned his studies to devote himself to journalism and criticism. The first of his plays to be produced in 1912 were Er gendarme ("The Policeman") and Una notte d'amore ("One night of Love"), followed in 1914 by Extra dry and in 1916 by La maschera e il volto ("The Mask and the Face: A Grotesque in Three Acts"), which he had written in 1913, and on which much of his reputation rests. It was praised by Antonio Gramsci in his magazine Avanti! (11 April 1917) for the insight it showed into the chasm between one's persona and one's true personality. It was revived in London in 1993.

It was followed by La Scala di seta ("The Silken Ladder", 1917), Chimere ("Chimeras", 1920), La morte degli amanti ("The Lovers' Death", 1921), which was produced simultaneously in London, Fuochi d'artificio ("Fireworks", 1922), the radio play L'anello di Teodosio ("The Ring of Teodosio", 1929) and Un uomo da rifare ("A Man to Remake", 1932), among many others. His plays were produced throughout Europe and in America.

He was a theatre critic for the newspaper Il corriere di Milano from 1923, and the rise of Fascism in Italy prompted a shift in his expressed opinions from a delight in innovation to a defensive emphasis on the authentically Italian qualities of Novecento drama. A collection of stories, Karakè e altri racconti, was published in 1944.

He died in Rome in 1947.

== Selected filmography ==
- The Knight of San Marco (1939)
- Luisa Sanfelice (1942)
