= Grotesque =

Art style

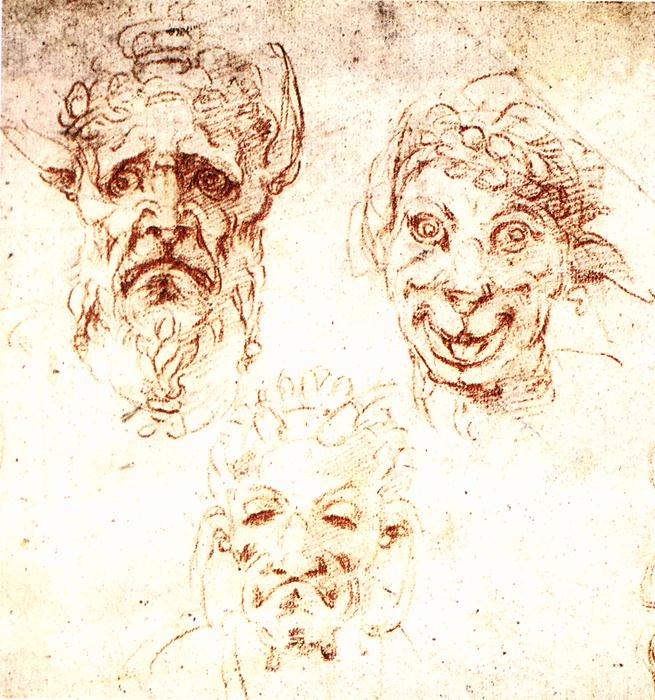
Grotesque studies, Michelangelo.

Grotesque is an adjective often used to describe strange shapes and distorted forms. In art, performance, and literature, however, grotesque may also refer to something that simultaneously invokes an audience feeling of uncomfortable bizarreness as well as sympathetic pity.

The English word first appears in the 1560s as a noun borrowed from French, itself originally from the Italian grottesca (literally "of a cave" from the Italian grotta, 'cave'; see grotto), an extravagant style of ancient Roman decorative art rediscovered at Rome at the end of the fifteenth century and subsequently imitated. The word was first used of paintings found on the walls of basements of ruins in Rome that were called at that time le Grotte ('the caves'). These 'caves' were in fact rooms and corridors of the Domus Aurea, the unfinished palace complex started by Nero after the Great Fire of Rome in AD 64, which had become overgrown and buried, until they were broken into again, mostly from above. Spreading from Italian to the other European languages, the term was long used largely interchangeably with arabesque and moresque for types of decorative patterns using curving foliage elements. The word has been used as an English adjective since at least the 18th century.

Rémi Astruc has argued that although there is an immense variety of motifs and figures, the three main tropes of the grotesque are doubleness, hybridity and metamorphosis. Beyond the current understanding of the grotesque as an aesthetic category, he demonstrated how the grotesque functions as a fundamental existential experience. Moreover, Astruc identifies the grotesque as a crucial, and potentially universal, anthropological device that societies have used to conceptualize alterity and change.

== History ==
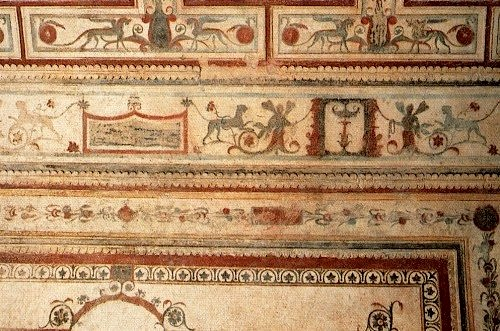
Roman frescos in Nero's Domus Aurea, Rome, unknown painter, c. 64–68 AD.

=== Early examples in Roman ornament ===
In art, grotesques are ornamental arrangements of arabesques with interlaced garlands and small and fantastic human and animal figures, usually set out in a symmetrical pattern around some form of architectural framework, though this may be very flimsy. Such designs were fashionable in ancient Rome, especially as fresco wall decoration and floor mosaic. Stylized versions, common in Imperial Roman decoration, were decried by Vitruvius (c. 30 BC) who, in dismissing them as meaningless and illogical, offered the following description:

For example, reeds are substituted for columns, fluted appendages with curly leaves and volutes take the place of pediments, candelabra support representations of shrines, and on top of their roofs grow slender stalks and volutes with human figures senselessly seated upon them.

Emperor Nero's palace in Rome, the Domus Aurea, was rediscovered by chance in the late 15th century, buried in fifteen hundred years of land fill. Access into the palace's remains was from above, requiring visitors to be lowered into it using ropes as in a cave, or grotte in Italian. The palace's wall decorations in fresco and delicate stucco were a revelation.

=== Etymology in Renaissance ===
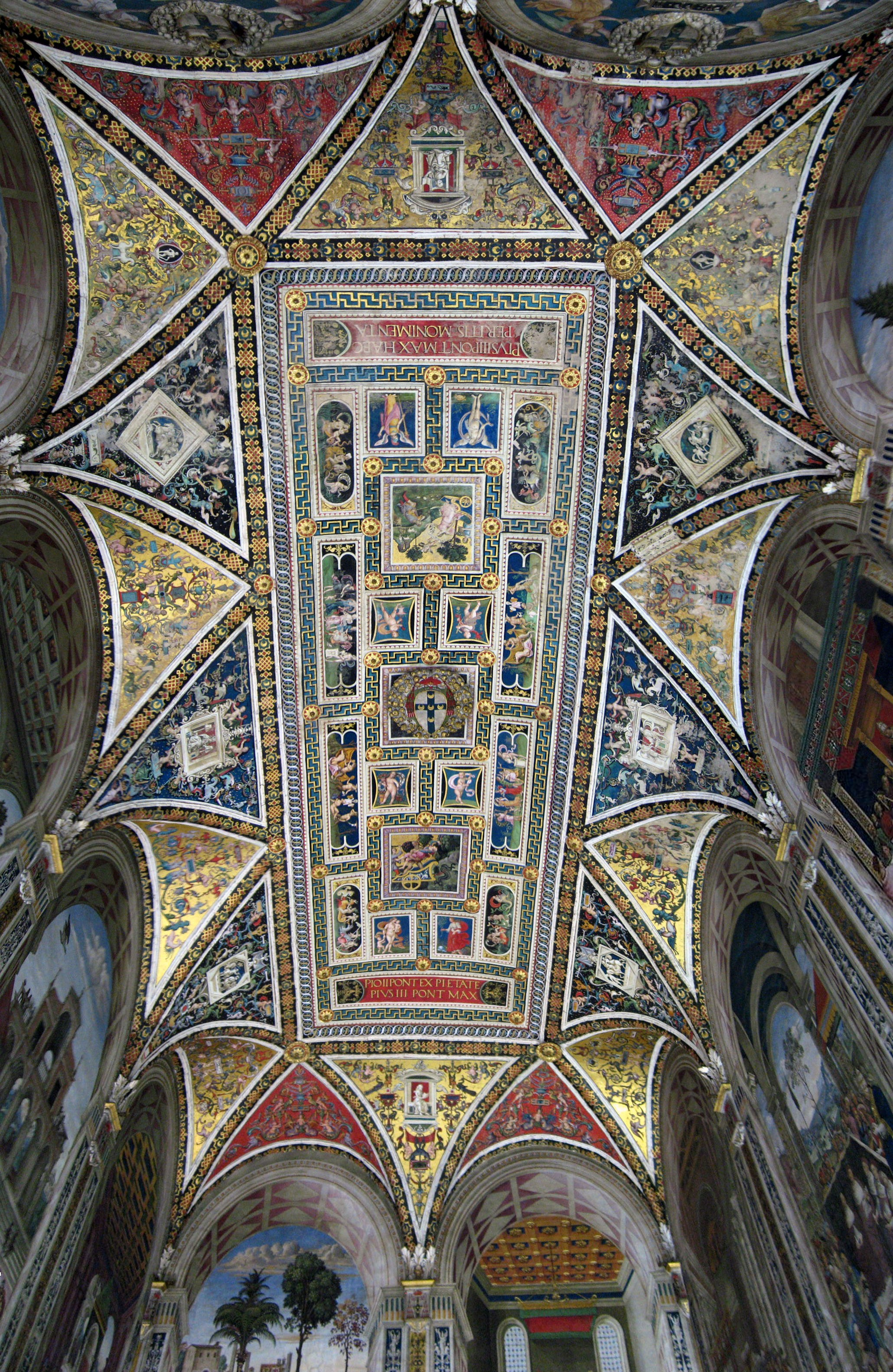
Ceiling of the Piccolomini Library, Siena Cathedral, Siena, Italy, by Pinturicchio and his assistants, 1502–1503.

The first appearance of the word grottesche appears in a contract of 1502 for the Piccolomini Library attached to the duomo of Siena. They were introduced by Raphael Sanzio and his team of decorative painters, who developed grottesche into a complete system of ornament in the Loggias that are part of the series of Raphael's Rooms in the Vatican Palace, Rome. "The decorations astonished and charmed a generation of artists that was familiar with the grammar of the classical orders but had not guessed till then that in their private houses the Romans had often disregarded those rules and had adopted instead a more fanciful and informal style that was all lightness, elegance and grace." In these grotesque decorations a tablet or candelabrum might provide a focus; frames were extended into scrolls that formed part of the surrounding designs as a kind of scaffold, as Peter Ward-Jackson noted. Light scrolling grotesques could be ordered by confining them within the framing of a pilaster to give them more structure. Giovanni da Udine took up the theme of grotesques in decorating the Villa Madama, the most influential of the new Roman villas.

In the 16th century, such artistic license and irrationality was controversial matter. Francisco de Holanda puts a defense in the mouth of Michelangelo in his third dialogue of Da Pintura Antiga, 1548:

this insatiable desire of man sometimes prefers to an ordinary building, with its pillars and doors, one falsely constructed in grotesque style, with pillars formed of children growing out of stalks of flowers, with architraves and cornices of branches of myrtle and doorways of reeds and other things, all seeming impossible and contrary to reason, yet it may be really great work if it is performed by a skillful artist.

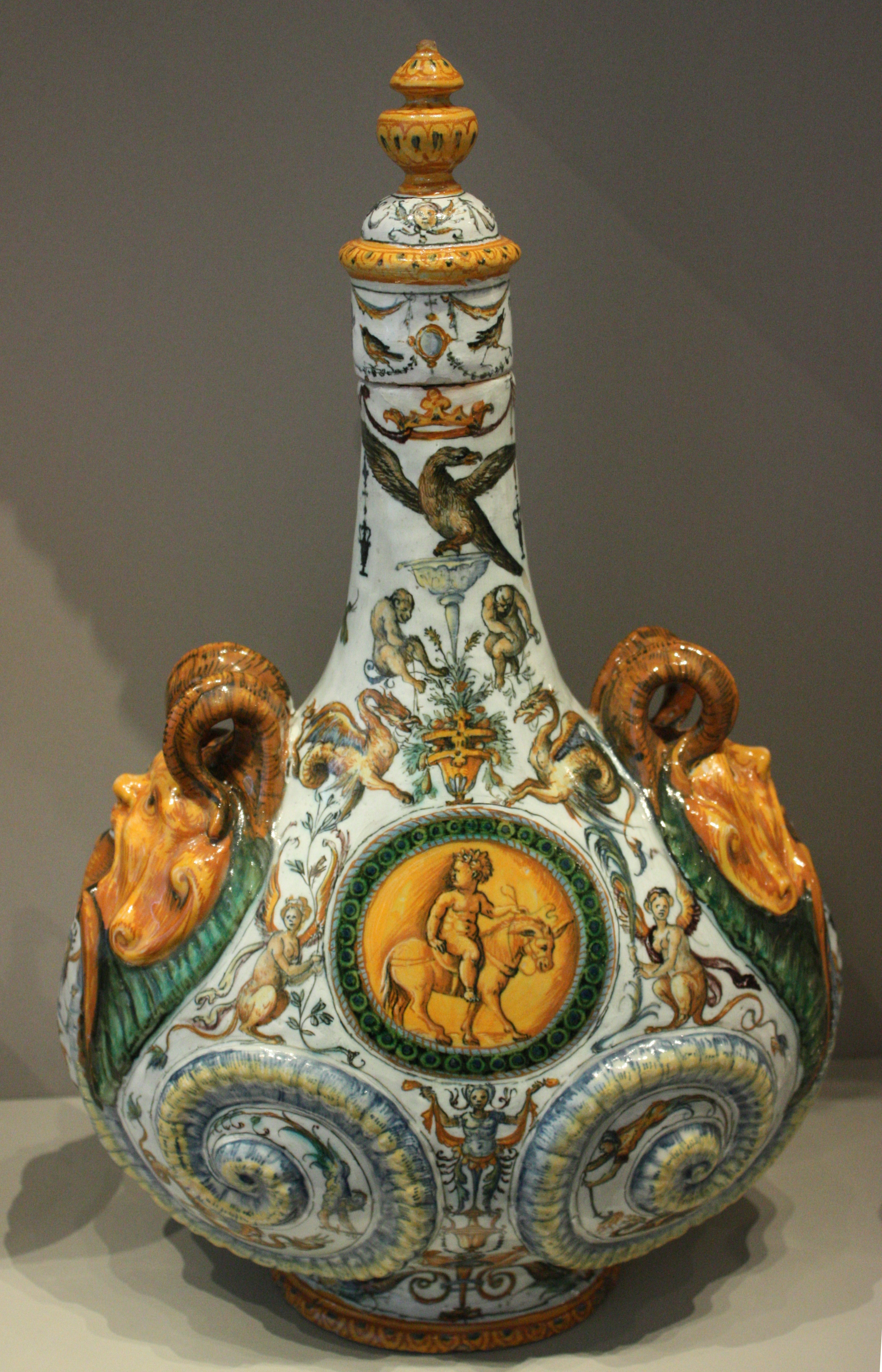
Pilgrim bottle, by the Fontana workshop from Urbino, Italy, c. 1560–1570, tin glazed earthenware (majolica), Victoria and Albert Museum, London

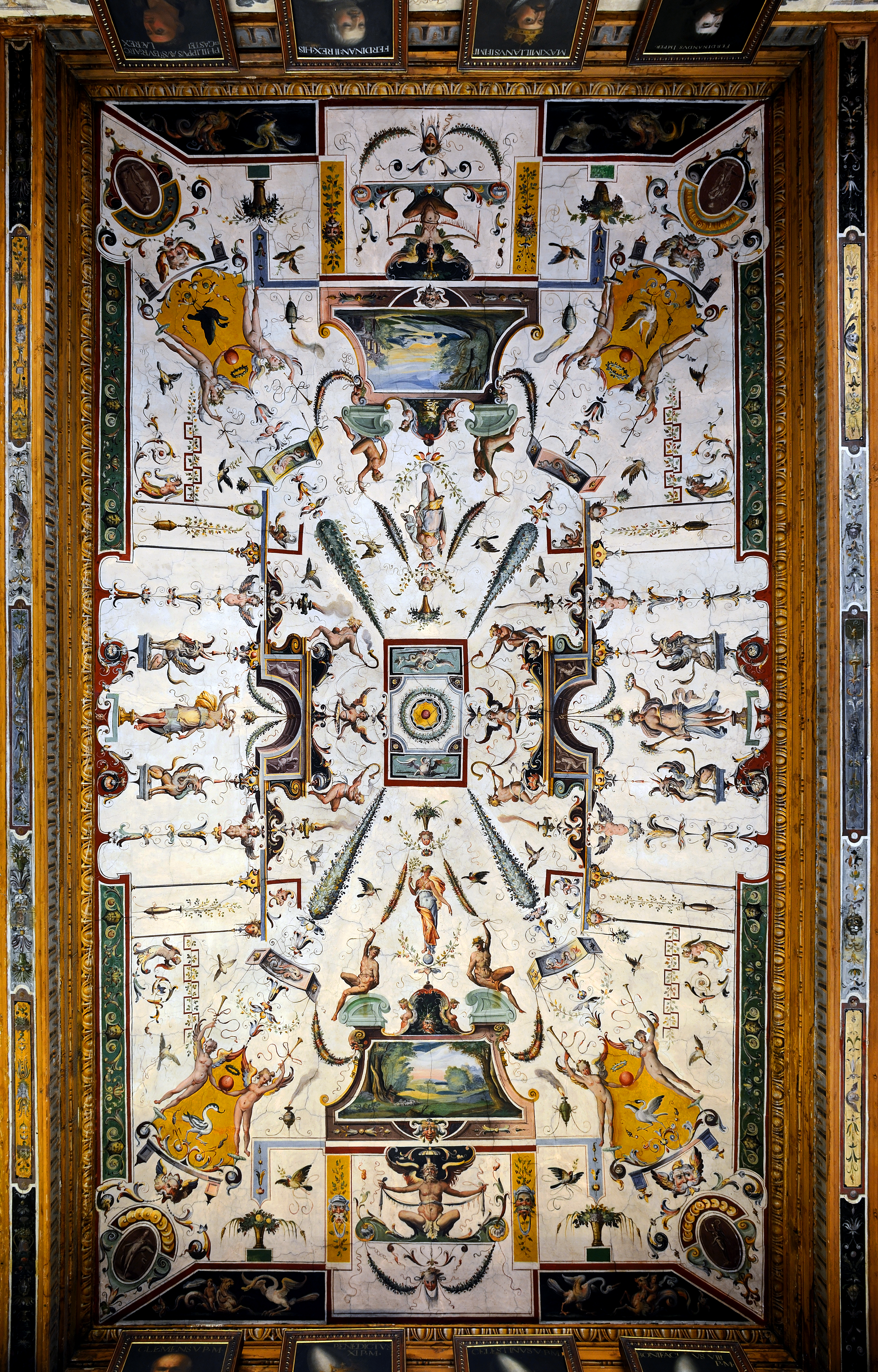
Ceiling decorated with arabesques in the Uffizi Gallery, Florence, Italy, by various architects, including Giorgio Vasari, c. 1560–1581

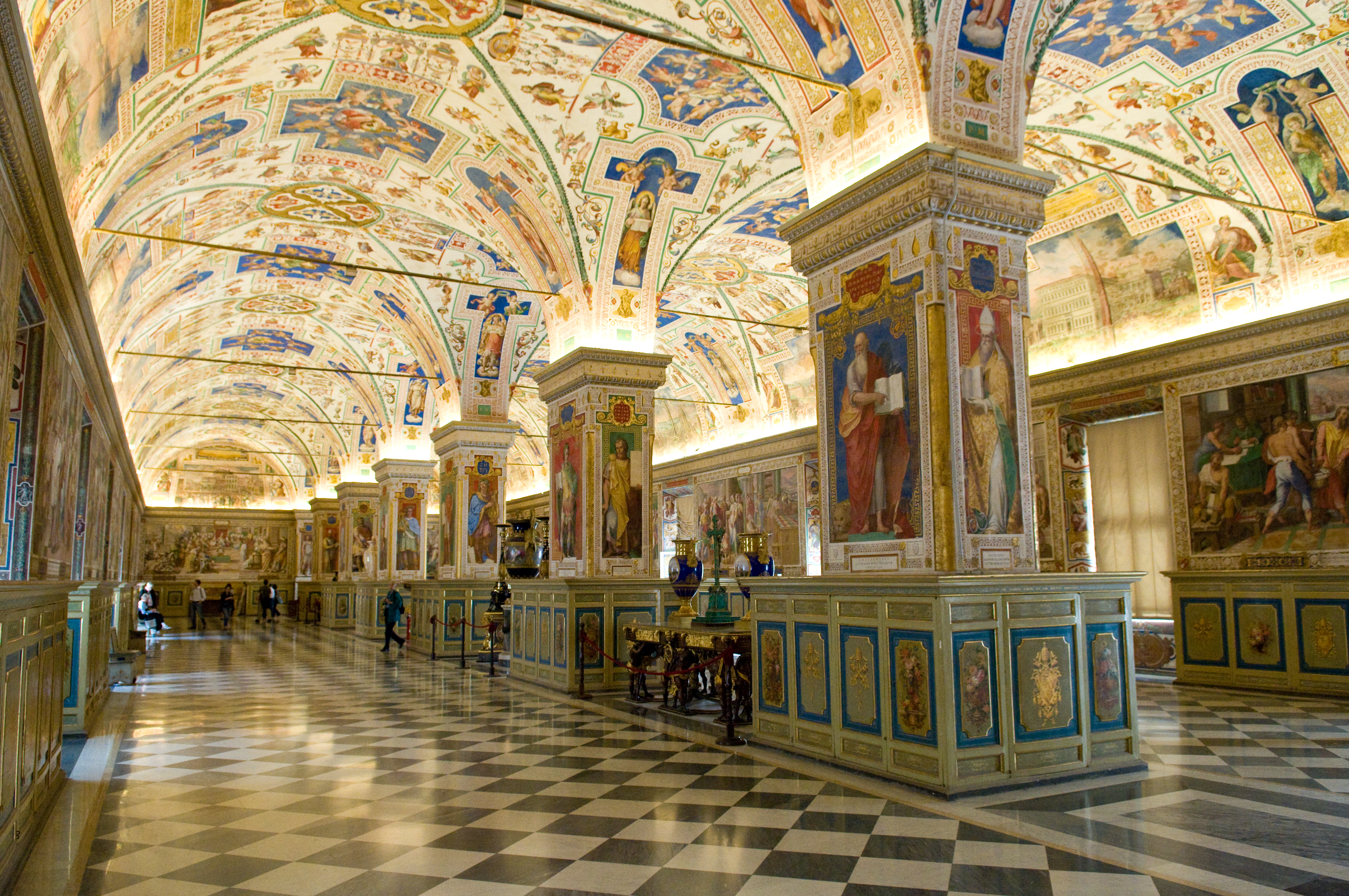
Ceilings decorated with grotesques in the Vatican Library, Vatican City, by Domenico Fontana, 1587–1588

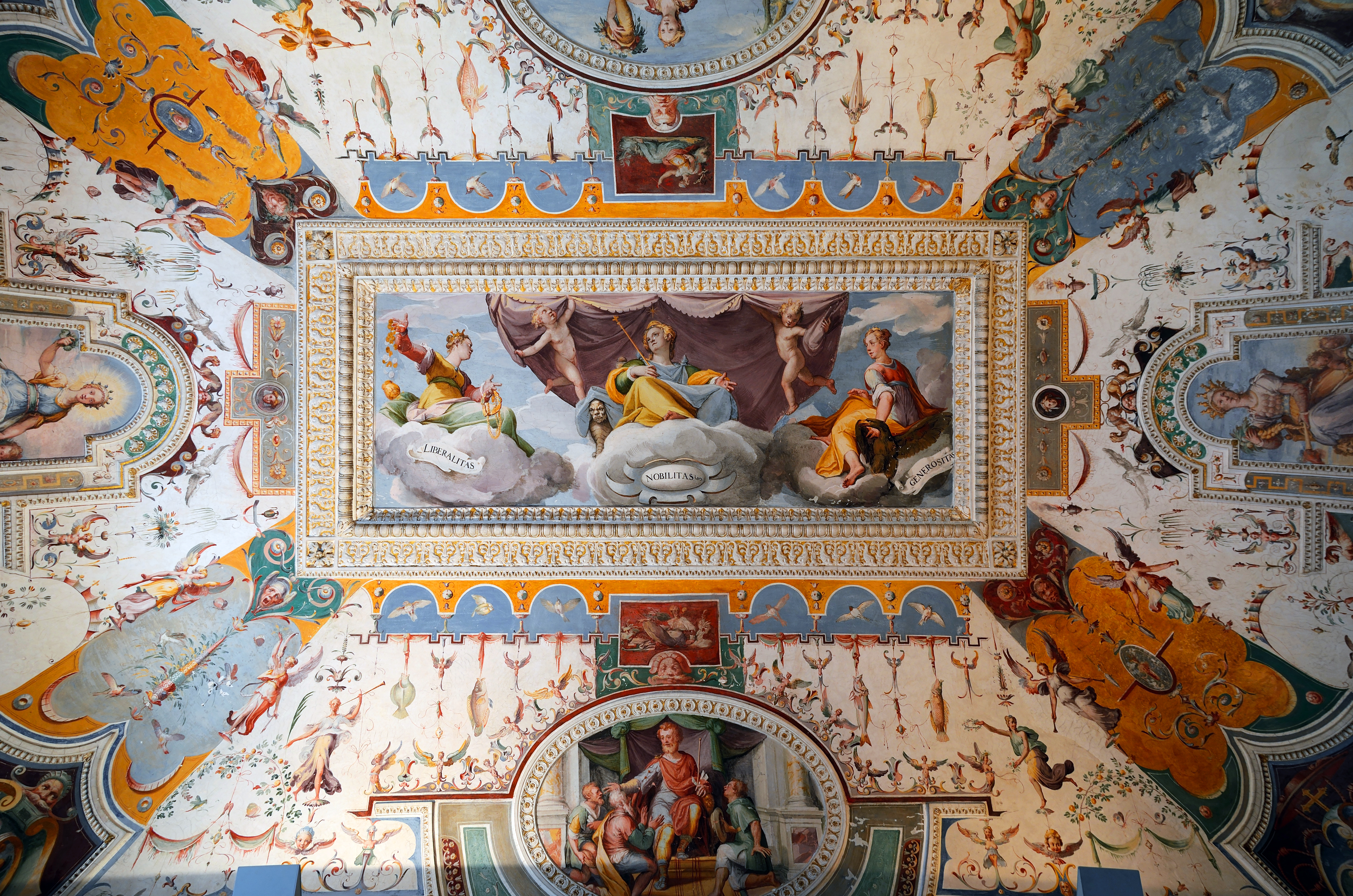
Mother Nature is surrounded by grottesche in this fresco detail from Villa d'Este.

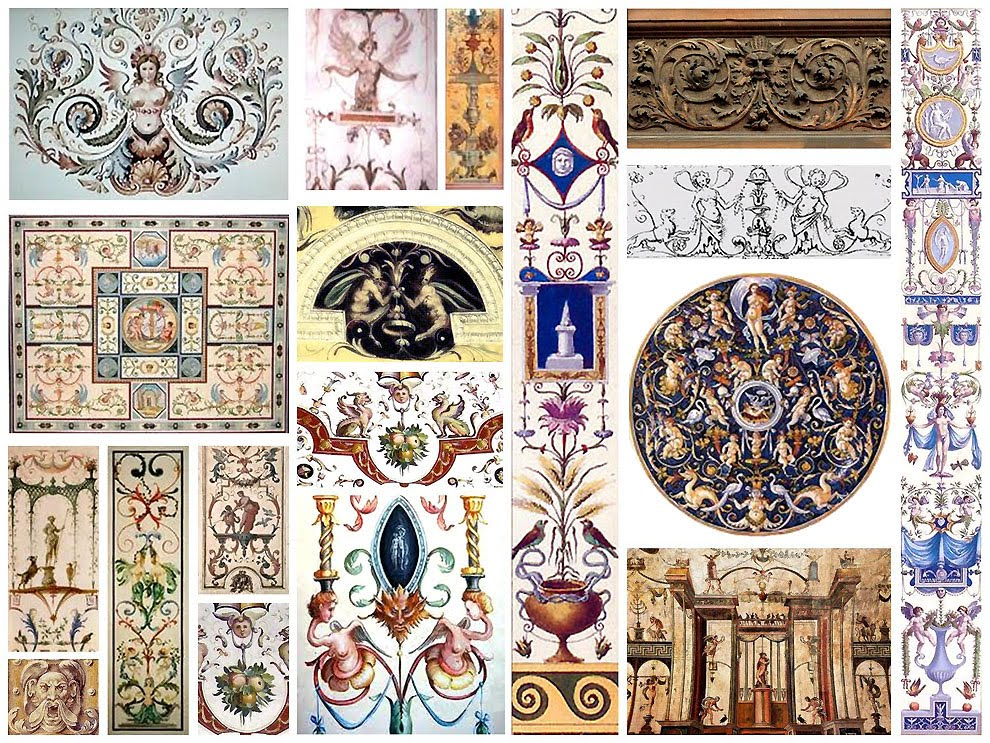
Renaissance grotesque motifs in assorted formats

=== Mannerism ===
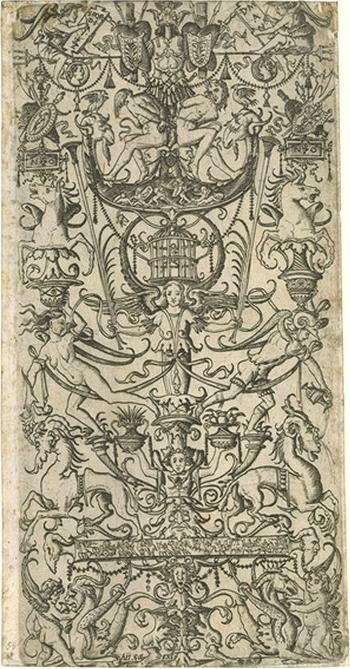
Grotesque engraving on paper, about 1500–1512, by Nicoletto da Modena.

The delight of Mannerist artists and their patrons in arcane iconographic programs available only to the erudite could be embodied in schemes of grottesche, Andrea Alciato's Emblemata (1522) offered ready-made iconographic shorthand for vignettes. More familiar material for grotesques could be drawn from Ovid's Metamorphoses.

The Vatican loggias, a loggia corridor space in the Apostolic Palace open to the elements on one side, was decorated around 1519 by Raphael's large team of artists, with Giovanni da Udine the main hand involved. Because of the relative unimportance of the space, and a desire to copy the Domus Aurea style, no large paintings were used, and the surfaces were mostly covered with grotesque designs on a white background, with paintings imitating sculptures in niches, and small figurative subjects in a revival of Ancient Roman style. This large array provided a repertoire of elements that were the basis for later artists across Europe.

In Michelangelo's Medici Chapel Giovanni da Udine composed during 1532–1533 "most beautiful sprays of foliage, rosettes and other ornaments in stucco and gold" in the coffers and "sprays of foliage, birds, masks and figures", with a result that did not please Pope Clement VII Medici, however, nor Giorgio Vasari, who whitewashed the grotesque decor in 1556. Counter Reformation writers on the arts, notably Cardinal Gabriele Paleotti, bishop of Bologna, turned upon grottesche with a righteous vengeance.

Vasari, echoing Vitruvius, described the style as follows:

Grotesques are a type of extremely licentious and absurd painting done by the ancients ... without any logic, so that a weight is attached to a thin thread which could not support it, a horse is given legs made of leaves, a man has crane's legs, with countless other impossible absurdities; and the bizarrer the painter's imagination, the higher he was rated.

Vasari recorded that Francesco Ubertini, called "Bacchiacca", delighted in inventing grotteschi, and (about 1545) painted for Duke Cosimo de' Medici a studiolo in a mezzanine at the Palazzo Vecchio "full of animals and rare plants". Other 16th-century writers on grottesche included Daniele Barbaro, Pirro Ligorio and Gian Paolo Lomazzo.

=== Engravings, woodwork, book illustration, decorations ===
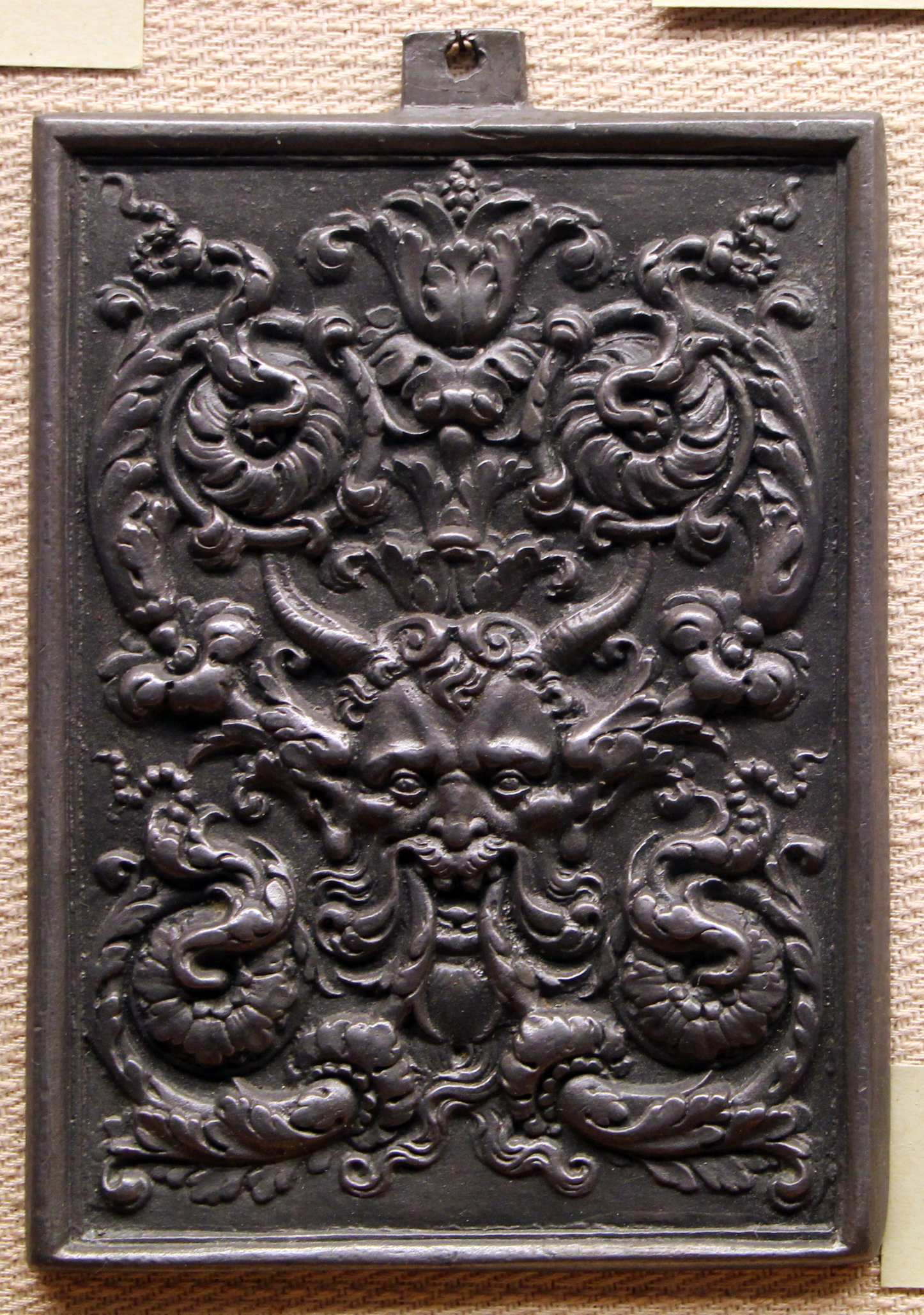
Decorative panel showing the two separable elements of Grotesque: the elaborate acanthus leaf and candelabra type design and the hideous mask or face

In the meantime, through the medium of engravings the grotesque mode of surface ornament passed into the European artistic repertory of the 16th century, from Spain to Poland. A classic suite was that attributed to Enea Vico, published in 1540–41 under an evocative explanatory title, Leviores et extemporaneae picturae quas grotteschas vulgo vocant, "Light and extemporaneous pictures that are vulgarly called grotesques". Later Mannerist versions, especially in engraving, tended to lose that initial lightness and be much more densely filled than the airy well-spaced style used by the Romans and Raphael.

Soon grottesche appeared in marquetry (fine woodwork), in maiolica produced above all at Urbino from the late 1520s, then in book illustration and in other decorative uses. At Fontainebleau Rosso Fiorentino and his team enriched the vocabulary of grotesques by combining them with the decorative form of strapwork, the portrayal of leather straps in plaster or wood moldings, which forms an element in grotesques.

=== From Baroque to Victorian era ===
In the 17th and 18th centuries the grotesque encompasses a wide field of teratology (science of monsters) and artistic experimentation. The monstrous, for instance, often occurs as the notion of play. The sportiveness of the grotesque category can be seen in the notion of the preternatural category of the lusus naturae, in natural history writings and in cabinets of curiosities. The last vestiges of romance, such as the marvellous also provide opportunities for the presentation of the grotesque in, for instance, operatic spectacle. The mixed form of the novel was commonly described as grotesque – see for instance Fielding's "comic epic poem in prose" (Joseph Andrews and Tom Jones).

Grotesque ornament received a further impetus from new discoveries of original Roman frescoes and stucchi at Pompeii and the other buried sites round Mount Vesuvius from the middle of the century. It continued in use, becoming increasingly heavy, in the Empire Style and then in the Victorian period, when designs often became as densely packed as in 16th-century engravings, and the elegance and fancy of the style tended to be lost.

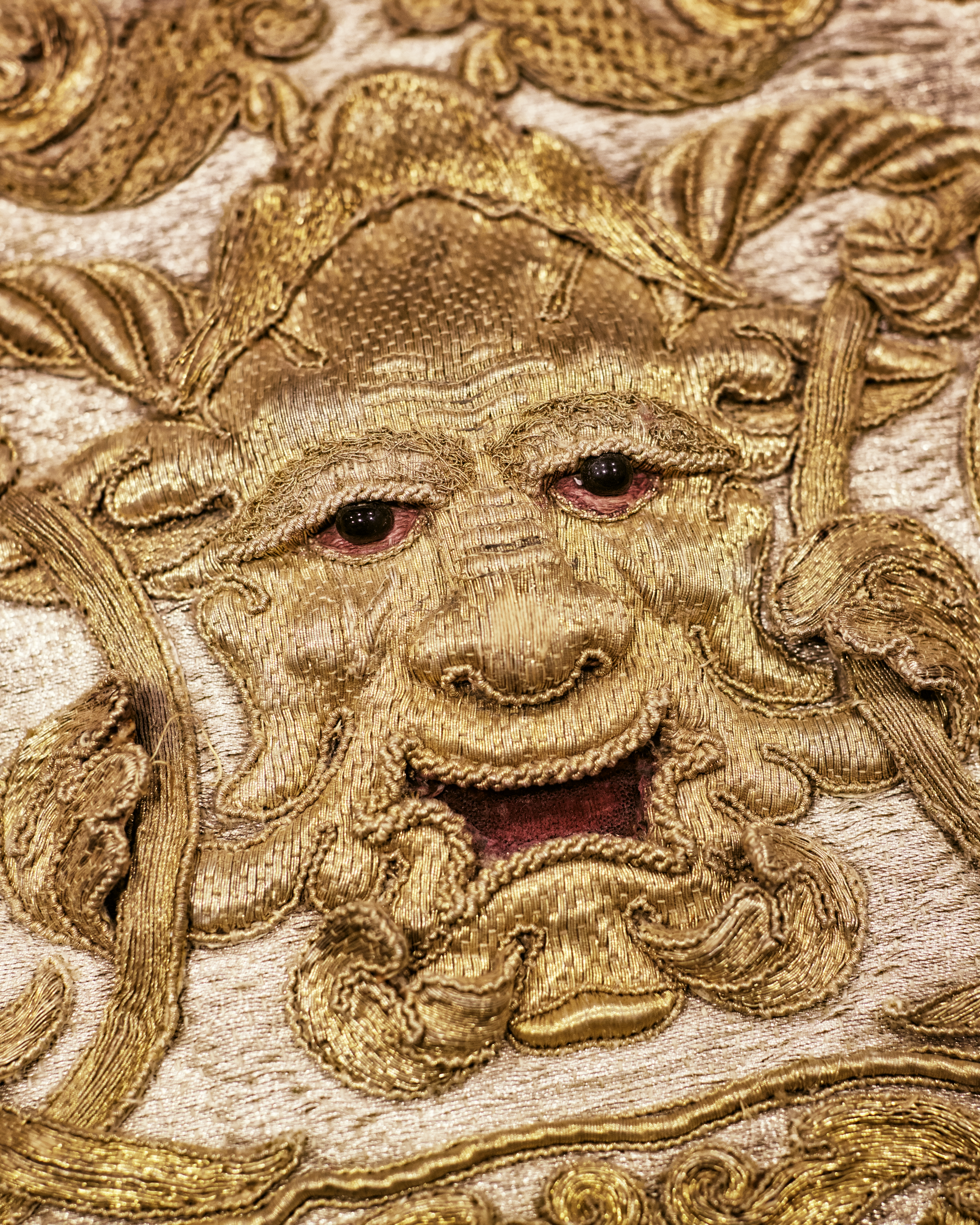
Baroque – grotesque on a saddle pad, 1600–1650, gold thread

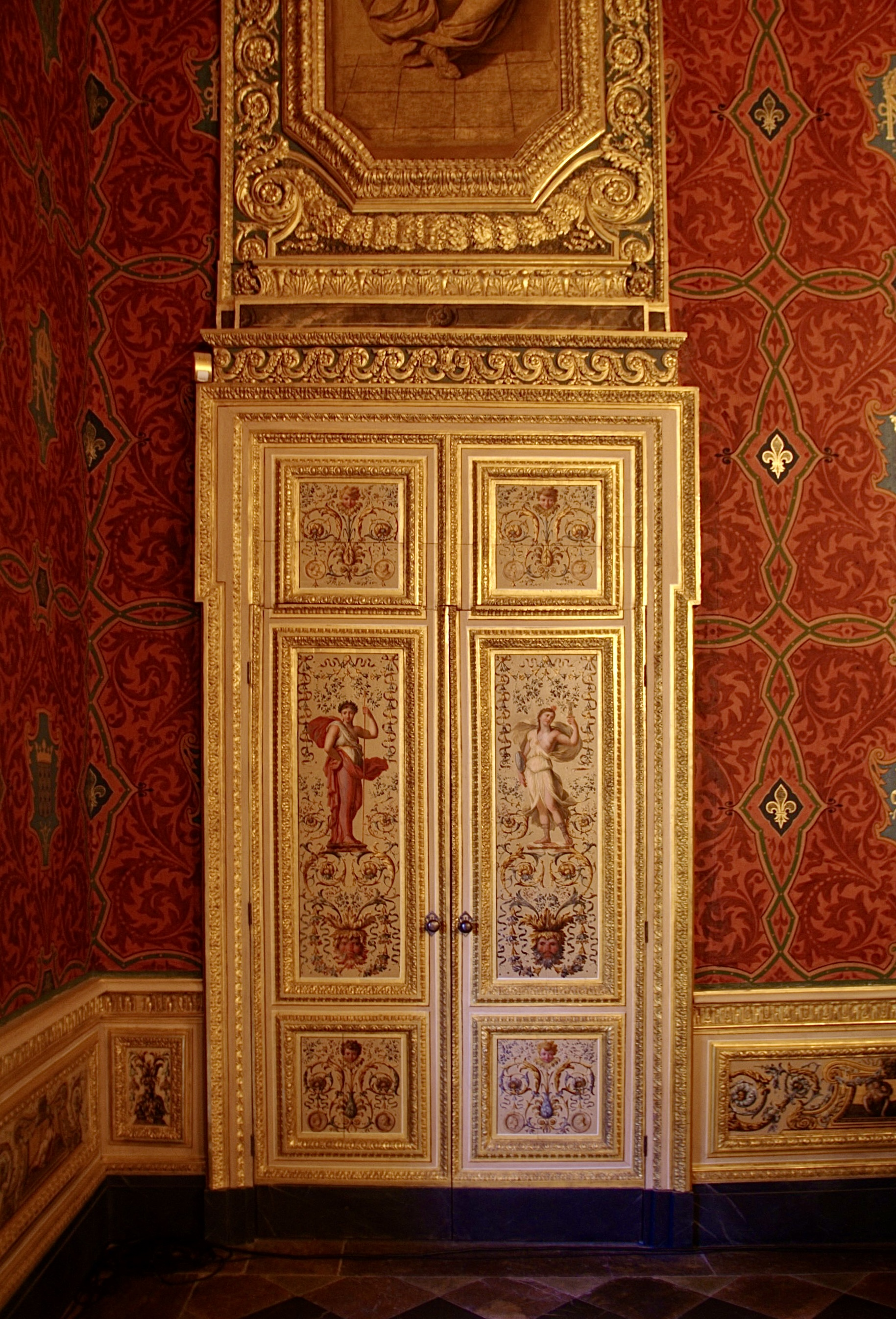
Baroque – grotesques on a door in the Palais du Parlement de Bretagne, Rennes, France, unknown architect, sculptor and painter, 17th century (Louis XIV era)

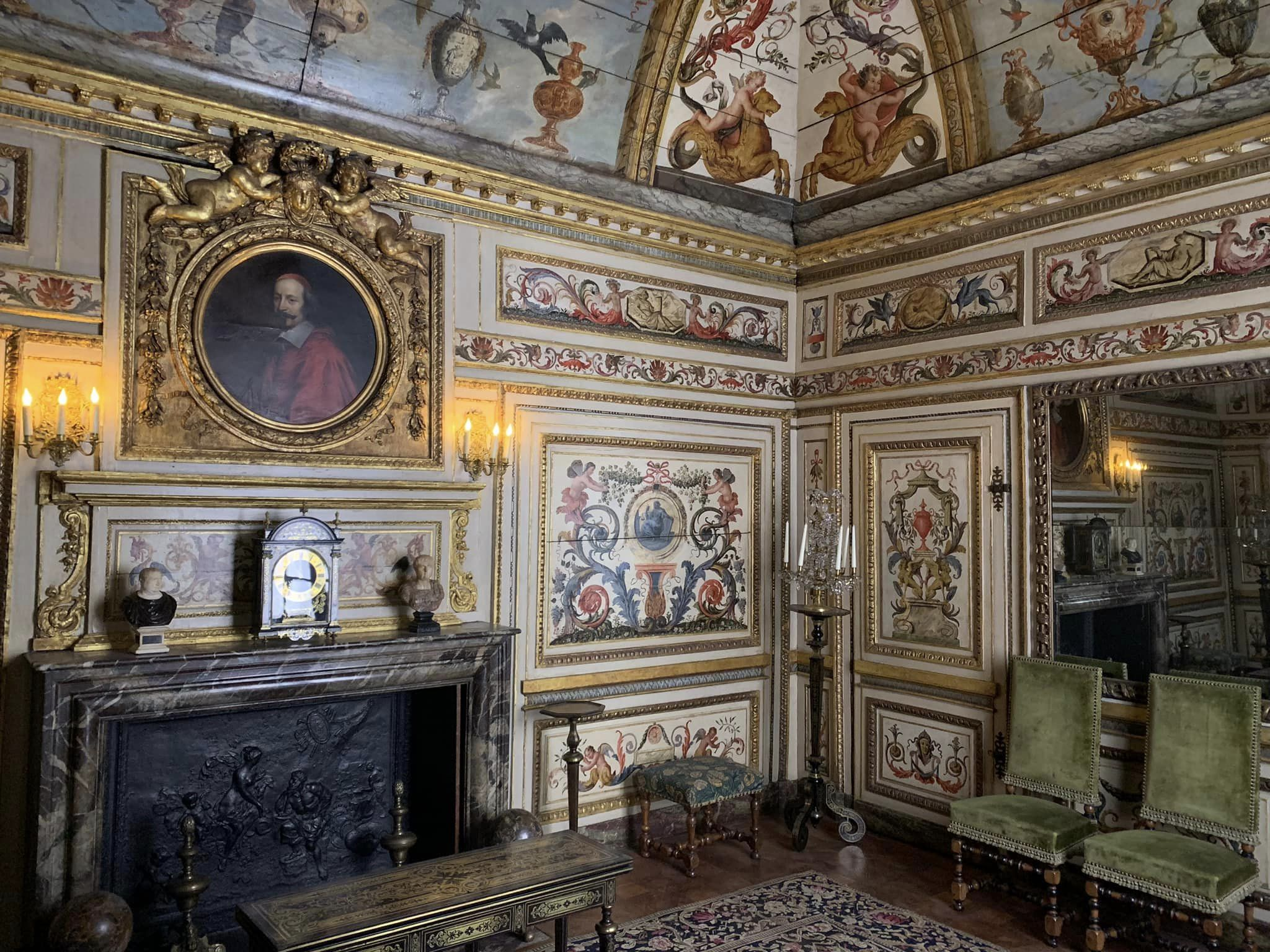
Baroque – grotesques on the boiserie of a room from the Hôtel Colbert de Villacerf, now in the Musée Carnavalet, Paris, unknown architect, sculptor and painter, c. 1650

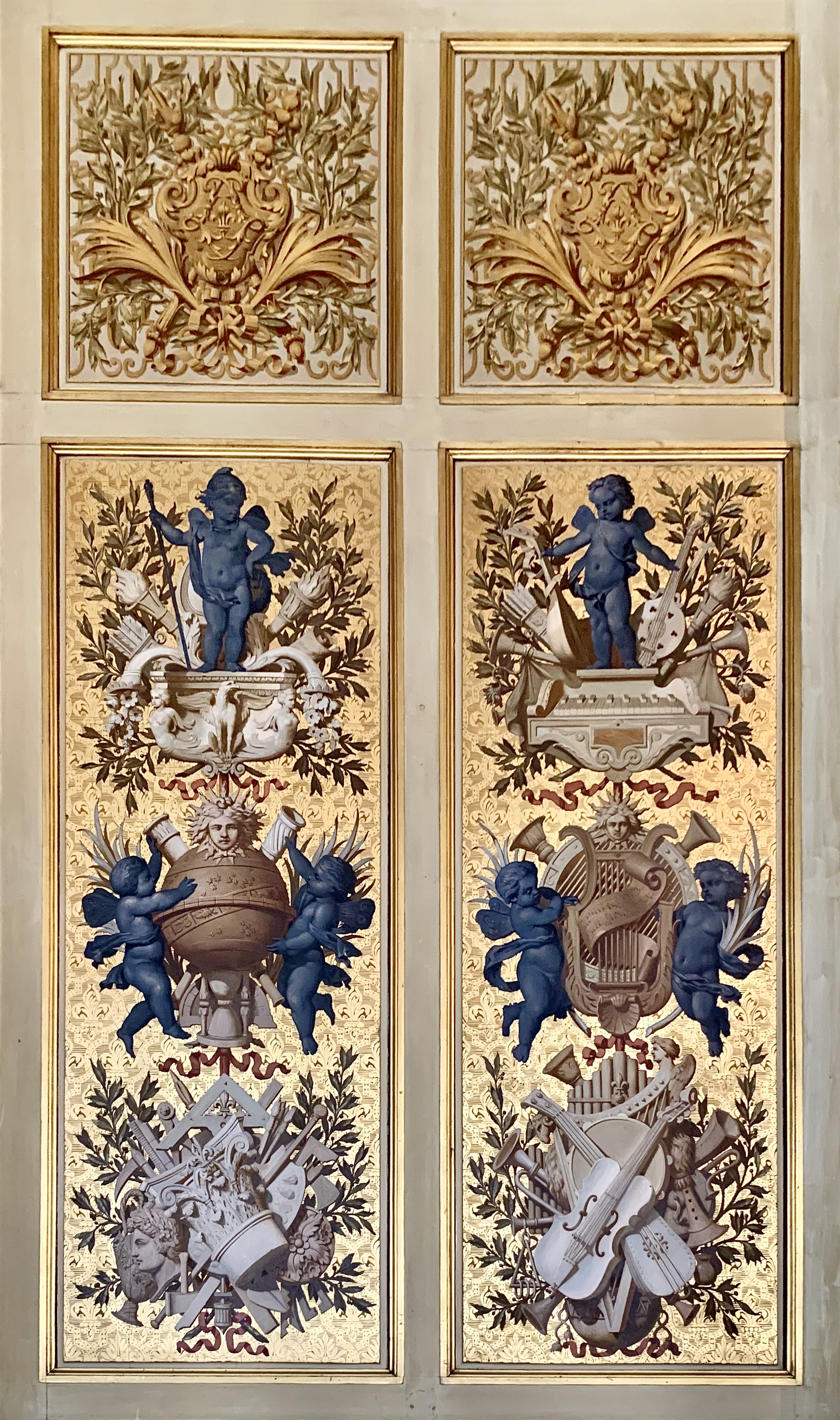
Baroque – grotesques on a door in the Galerie d'Apollon, Louvre Palace, Paris, by Louis Le Vau and Charles Le Brun, after 1661

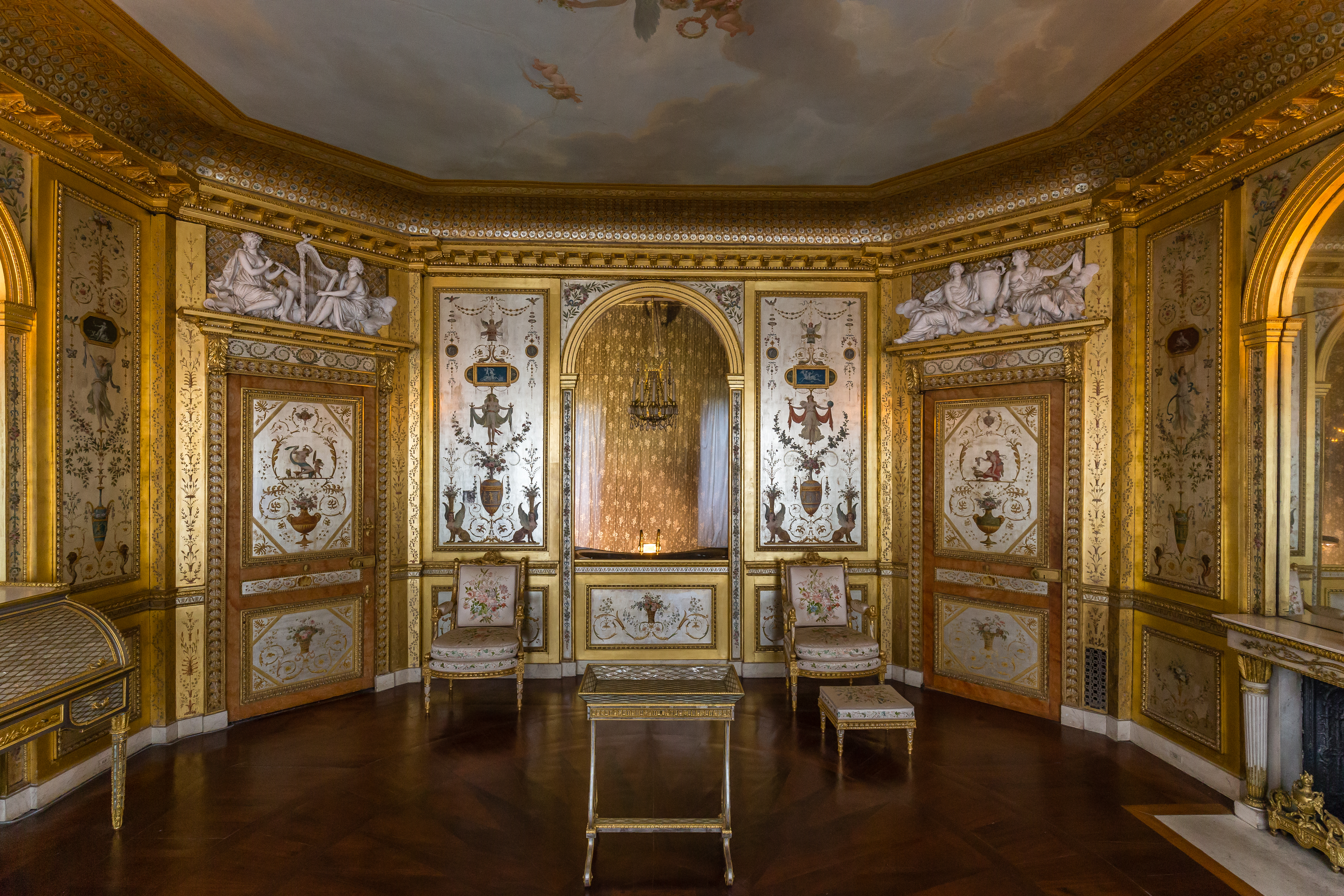
Louis XVI style – the Boudoir of Marie-Antoinette, Palace of Fontainebleau, Fontainebleau, France, decorated with arabesques in the Pompeiian Style, by the Rousseau brothers, 1785

Neoclassical – door, by Pierre Rousseau, 1790s, oil on panel, Cleveland Museum of Art, Cleveland, US

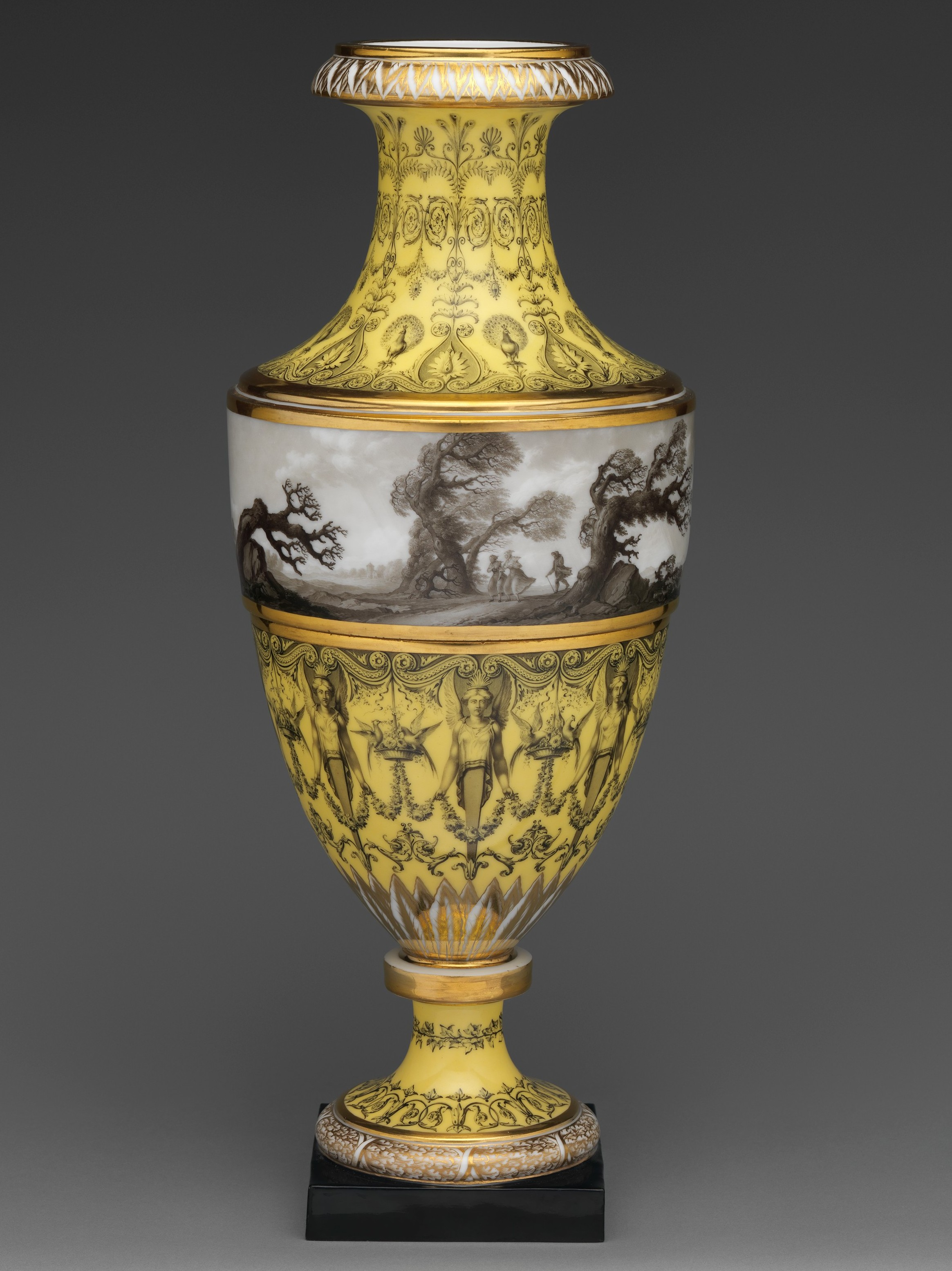
Neoclassical – vase with scenes of storm on land and grotesques, by the Duc d'Angoulême's porcelain factory, c. 1797–1798, hard-paste porcelain, Metropolitan Museum of Art, New York

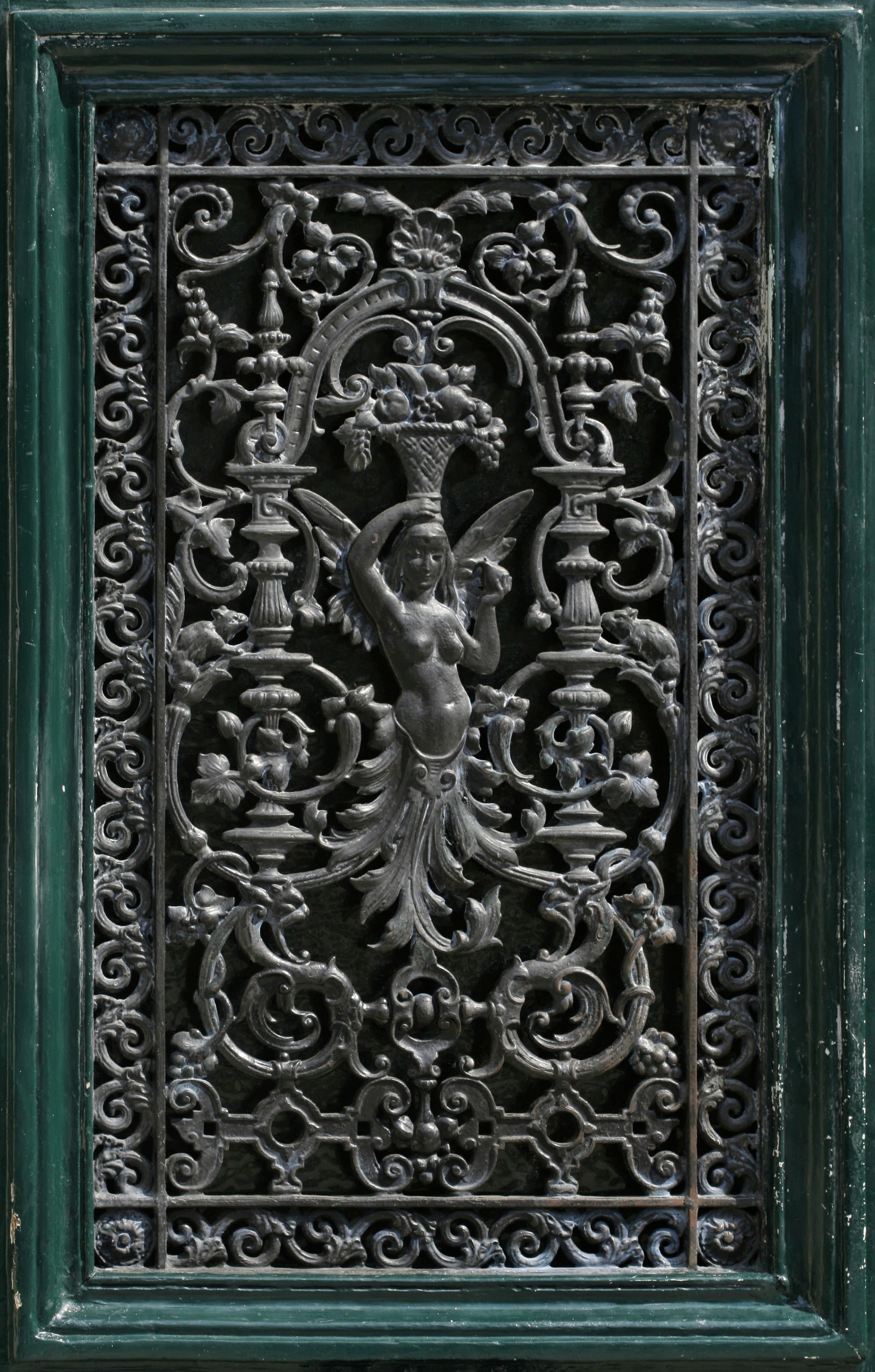
Renaissance Revival – cast iron door window grill of a building on the Boulevard du Temple no. 42, Paris, unknown architect, c. 1850

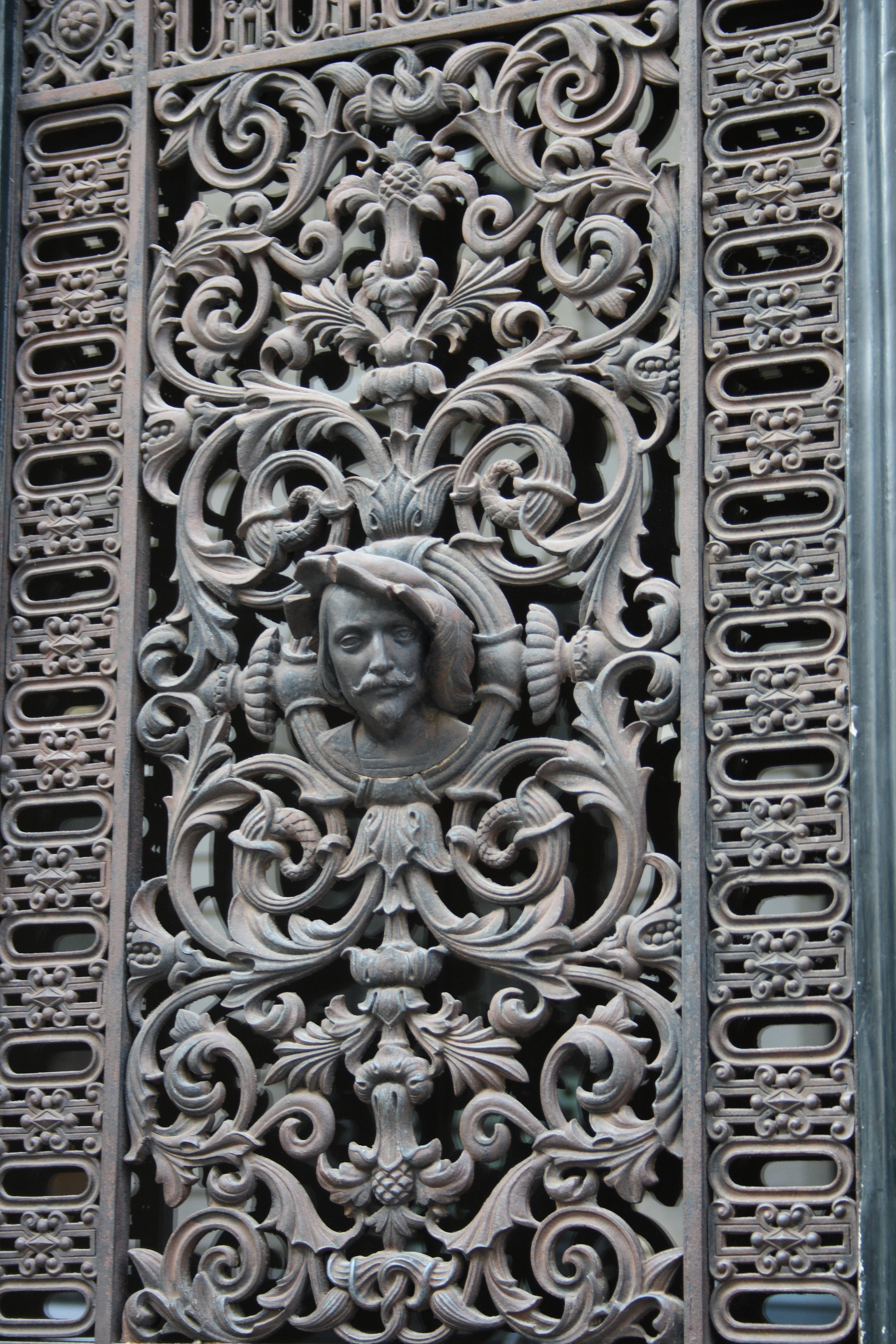
Renaissance Revival – cast iron door window grill of Rue du Bac no. 34, Paris, unknown architect, c. 1850

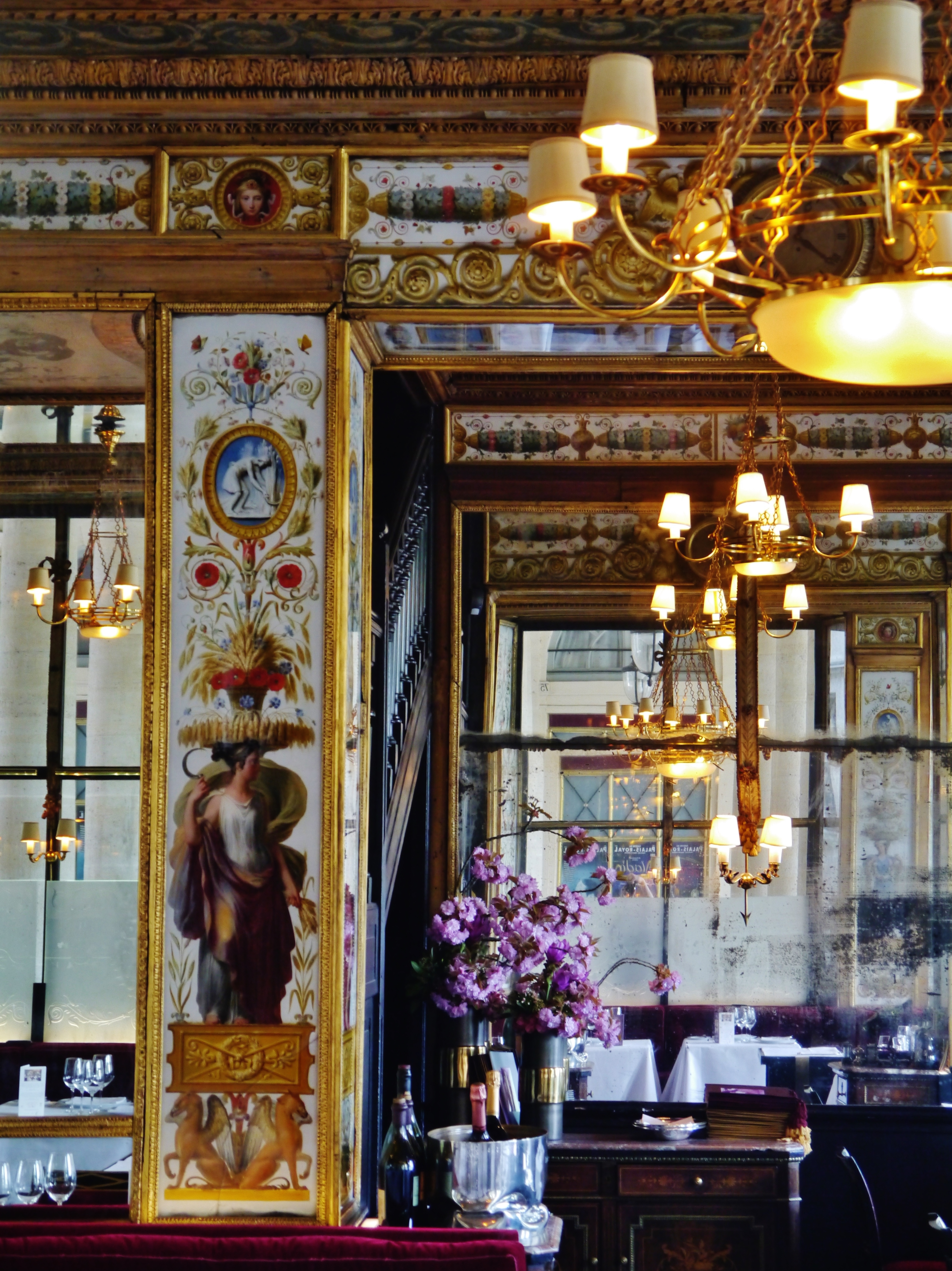
Neoclassical – interior of Le Grand Véfour, Paris, by M.L. Viguet, 1852

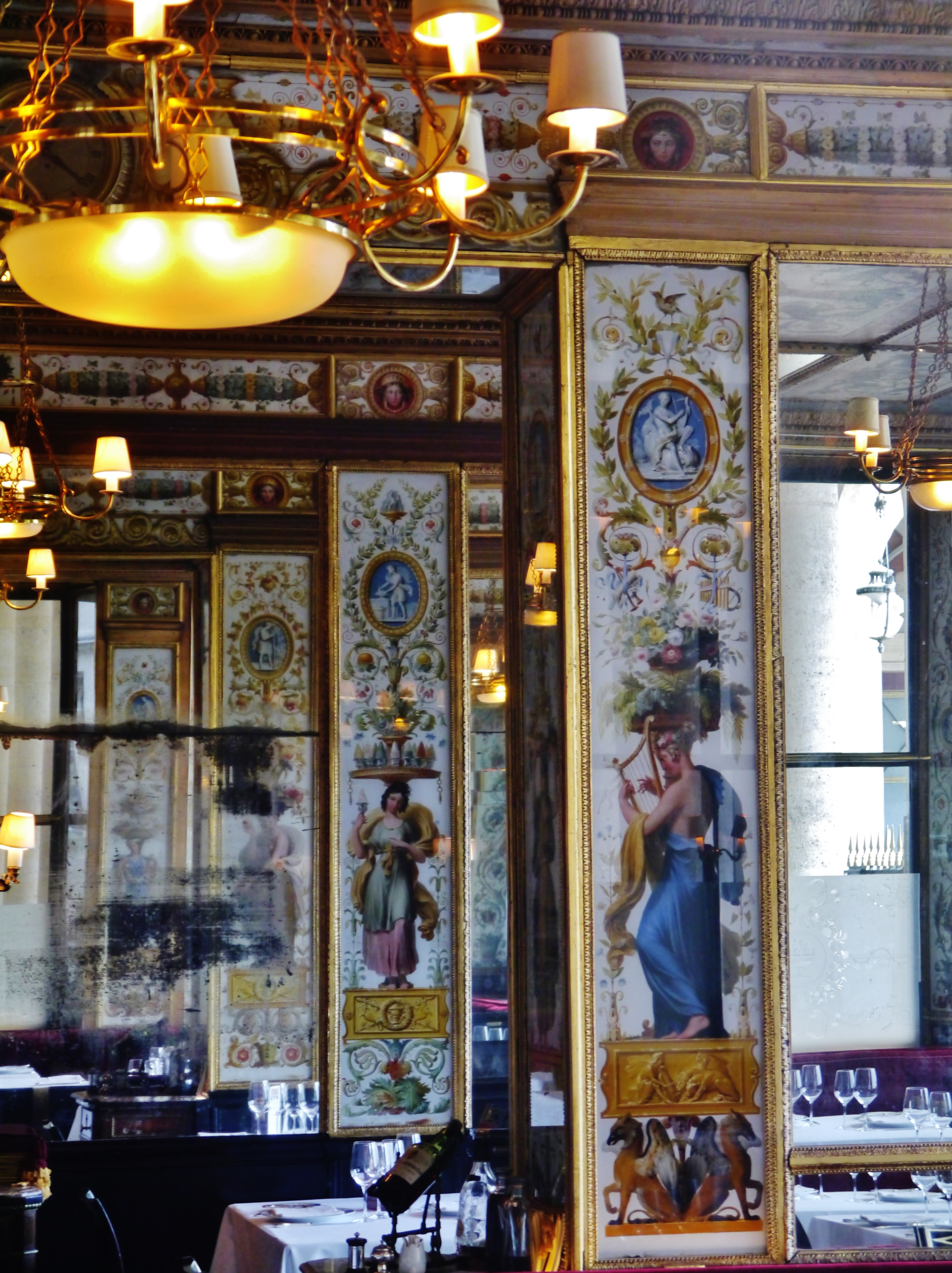
Neoclassical – interior of Le Grand Véfour, Paris, by M.L. Viguet, 1852

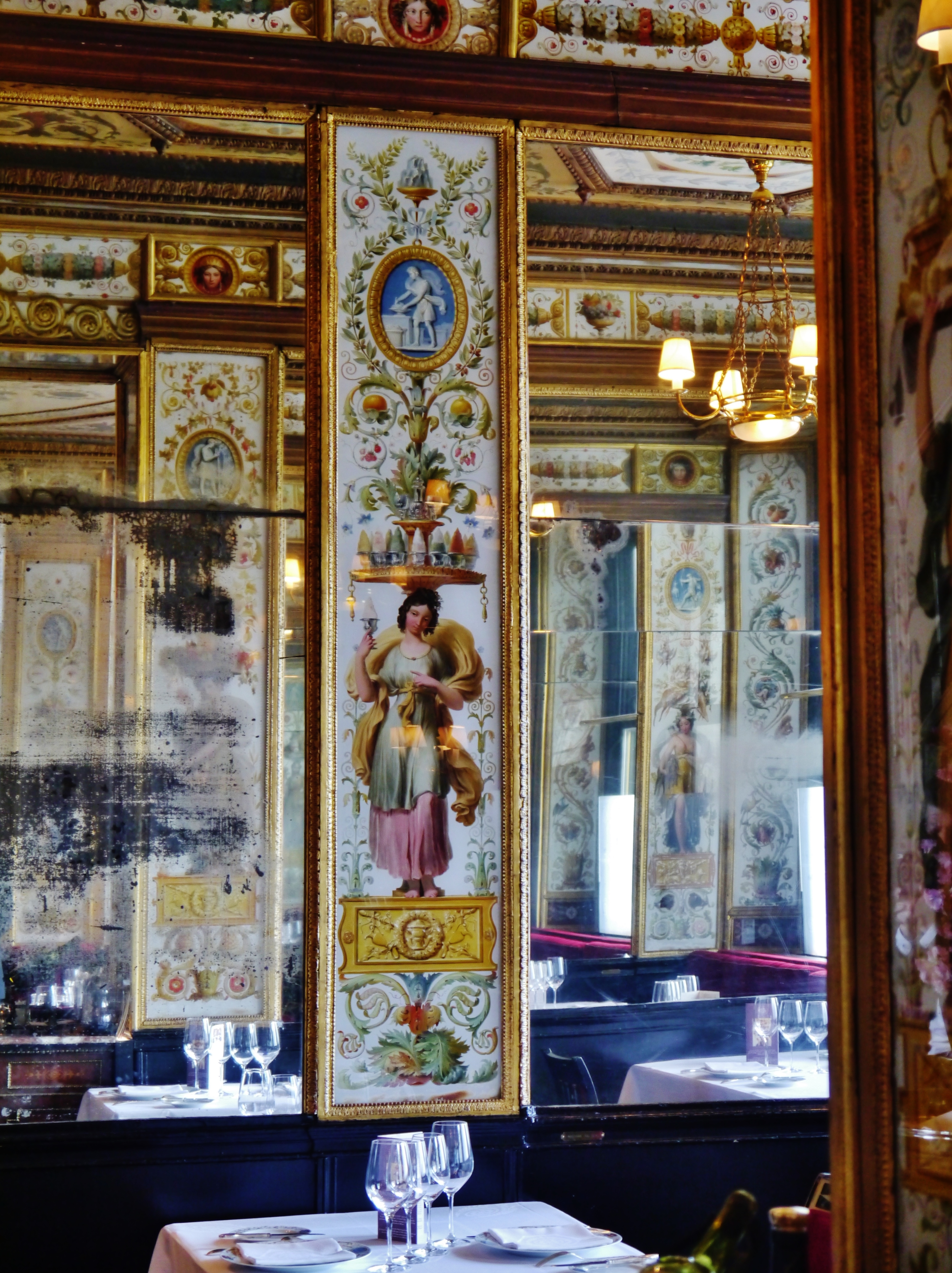
Neoclassical – interior of Le Grand Véfour, Paris, by M.L. Viguet, 1852

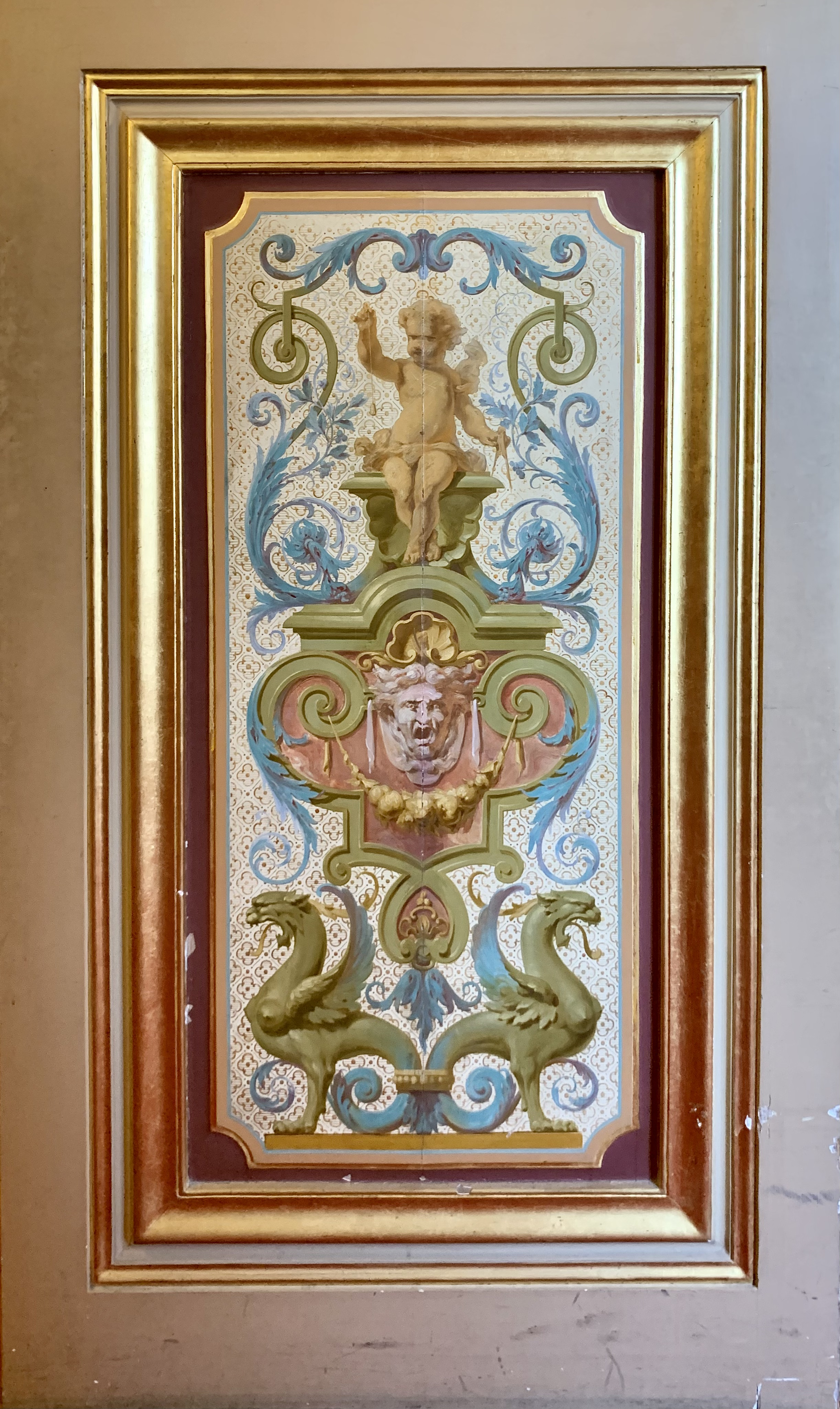
Eclectic – grotesques panel in the Napoleon III Apartments of the Louvre Palace, unknown painted and designer, c. 1860

== Extensions of the term in art ==
Artists began to give the tiny faces of the figures in grotesque decorations strange caricatured expressions, in a direct continuation of the medieval traditions of the drolleries in the border decorations or initials in illuminated manuscripts. From this the term began to be applied to larger caricatures, such as those of Leonardo da Vinci, and the modern sense began to develop. It is first recorded in English in 1646 from Sir Thomas Browne: "In nature there are no grotesques". By extension backwards in time, the term became also used for the medieval originals, and in modern terminology medieval drolleries, half-human thumbnail vignettes drawn in the margins, and carved figures on buildings (that are not also waterspouts, and so gargoyles) are also called "grotesques".

A boom in the production of works of art in the grotesque genre characterized the 1920–1933 period of German art. In contemporary illustration art, the "grotesque" figures, in the ordinary conversational sense, commonly appear in the genre grotesque art, also known as fantastic art.

== In literature ==
One of the first uses of the term grotesque to denote a literary genre is in Montaigne's Essays. The Grotesque is often linked with satire and tragicomedy. It is an effective artistic means to convey grief and pain to the audience, and for this has been labeled by Thomas Mann as the "genuine antibourgeois style".

Some of the earliest written texts describe grotesque happenings and monstrous creatures. The literature of myth has been a rich source of monsters; from the one-eyed Cyclops from Hesiod's Theogony to Homer's Polyphemus in the Odyssey. Ovid's Metamorphoses is another rich source for grotesque transformations and hybrid creatures of myth. Horace's Art of Poetry also provides a formal introduction to classical values and to the dangers of grotesque or mixed form. Indeed, the departure from classical models of order, reason, harmony, balance and form opens up the risk of entry into grotesque worlds. Accordingly, British literature abounds with native grotesquerie, from the strange worlds of Spenser's allegory in The Faerie Queene to the tragi-comic modes of 16th-century drama. (Grotesque comic elements can be found in major works such as King Lear.)

Literary works of mixed genre are occasionally termed grotesque, as are "low" or non-literary genres such as pantomime and farce. Gothic writings often have grotesque components in terms of character, style and location. In other cases, the environment described may be grotesque – whether urban (Charles Dickens), or the literature of the American South which has sometimes been termed "Southern Gothic". Sometimes the grotesque in literature has been explored in terms of social and cultural formations such as the carnival(-esque) in François Rabelais and Mikhail Bakhtin. Terry Castle has written on the relationship between metamorphosis, literary writings and masquerade.

Another major source of the grotesque is in satirical writings of the 18th century. Jonathan Swift's Gulliver's Travels provides a variety of approaches to grotesque representation. Corporeal hybridity is an essential marker in Swift. In poetry, the works of Alexander Pope provide many examples of the grotesque.

In fiction, characters are usually considered grotesque if they induce both empathy and disgust. (A character who inspires disgust alone is simply a villain or a monster.) Obvious examples would include the physically deformed and the mentally deficient, but people with cringe-worthy social traits are also included. The reader becomes piqued by the grotesque's positive side, and continues reading to see if the character can conquer their darker side. In Shakespeare's The Tempest, the figure of Caliban has inspired more nuanced reactions than simple scorn and disgust. Also, in J. R. R. Tolkien's The Lord of the Rings, the character of Gollum may be considered to have both disgusting and empathetic qualities, which fit the grotesque template.

Victor Hugo's The Hunchback of Notre-Dame is one of the most celebrated grotesques in literature. Dr. Frankenstein's monster from Mary Shelley's 1818 novel Frankenstein; or, The Modern Prometheus can also be considered a grotesque, as well as the title character, Erik, in The Phantom of the Opera and the Beast in Beauty and the Beast. Other instances of the romantic grotesque are also to be found in Edgar Allan Poe, E. T. A. Hoffmann, in Sturm und Drang literature or in Sterne's Tristram Shandy. The romantic grotesque is far more terrible and sombre than the medieval grotesque, which celebrated laughter and fertility. It is at this point that a grotesque creature such as Frankenstein's monster begins to be presented more sympathetically as the outsider who is the victim of society. But the novel also makes the issue of sympathy problematic in an unkind society. This means that society becomes the generator of the grotesque, by a process of alienation. In fact, the grotesque monster in Frankenstein tends to be described as "the creature".

The grotesque received a new shape with Alice's Adventures in Wonderland by Lewis Carroll, when a girl meets fantastic grotesque figures in her fantasy world. Carroll manages to make the figures seem less frightful and fit for children's literature, but still utterly strange. Another comic grotesque writer who played on the relationship between sense and nonsense was Edward Lear. Humorous or festive nonsense of this kind has its roots in the seventeenth-century traditions of fustian, bombastic and satirical writing.

During the nineteenth-century the category of grotesque body was increasingly displaced by the notion of congenital deformity or medical anomaly. Building on this context, the grotesque begins to be understood more as deformity and disability, especially after the First World War, 1914–18. In these terms, the art historian Leah Dickerman has argued that "The sight of horrendously shattered bodies of veterans returned to the home front became commonplace. The accompanying growth in the prosthetic industry struck contemporaries as creating a race of half-mechanical men and became an important theme in dadaist work.' The poetry of Wilfred Owen displays a poetic and realistic sense of the grotesque horror of war and the human cost of brutal conflict. Poems such as Spring Offensive and Greater Love combined images of beauty with shocking brutality and violence in order to produce a sense of the grotesque clash of opposites. In a similar fashion, Ernst Friedrich (1894–1967), founder of the Berlin Peace Museum, an anarchist and a pacifist, was the author of War Against War (1924) which used grotesque photographs of mutilated victims of the First World War in order to campaign for peace.

Southern Gothic is a genre frequently identified with grotesques and William Faulkner is often cited as the leading exponent. Flannery O'Connor wrote, "Whenever I'm asked why Southern writers particularly have a penchant for writing about freaks, I say it is because we are still able to recognize one" (Some Aspects of the Grotesque in Southern Fiction, 1960). In O'Connor's often-anthologized short story A Good Man Is Hard to Find, the Misfit, a serial killer, is clearly a maimed soul, utterly callous to human life, but driven to seek the truth. The less obvious grotesque is the polite, doting grandmother who is unaware of her own astonishing selfishness. Another oft-cited example of the grotesque from O'Connor's work is her short story entitled A Temple of the Holy Ghost.

== Contemporary writers ==
Contemporary writers of literary grotesque fiction include Ian McEwan, Katherine Dunn, Alasdair Gray, Angela Carter, Jeanette Winterson, Umberto Eco, Patrick McGrath, Jessica Anthony, Natsuo Kirino, Paul Tremblay, Matt Bell, Chuck Palahniuk, Brian Evenson, Richard Thomas and many authors who write in the bizarro genre of fiction.

== Pop culture ==
Other contemporary writers who have explored the grotesque in pop-culture are John Docker in the context of postmodernism; Cintra Wilson, who analyzes celebrity; and Francis Sanzaro, who discusses its relation to childbirth and obscenity.

Alien Resurrection (1997) is the only film rated by the MPAA to have "grotesque images" in its rating description, mainly due to its depiction of the Newborn xenomorph and the failed clones of Ellen Ripley, who all featured grotesque human–alien (hybrid) characteristics.

Grotesque manner also can be found at Disney's famous ride, The Haunted Mansion at Disneyland, Walt Disney World and other theme parks, where some of its details may contain a symbolism of Memento Mori, Samsara's circle or themes describing the fragility of human existence, passions that baffle and how they could be avoided or find a "way out".

== Theatre of the Grotesque ==
The term "Theatre of the Grotesque" refers to an anti-naturalistic school of Italian dramatists, writing in the 1910s and 1920s, who are often seen as precursors of the Theatre of the Absurd. Characterized by ironic and macabre themes of daily life in the World War 1 era, Theatre of the Grotesque was named after the play 'The Mask and the Face' by Luigi Chiarelli, which was described as 'a grotesque in three acts.'

Friedrich Dürrenmatt is a major author of contemporary grotesque comedy plays.

== In architecture ==
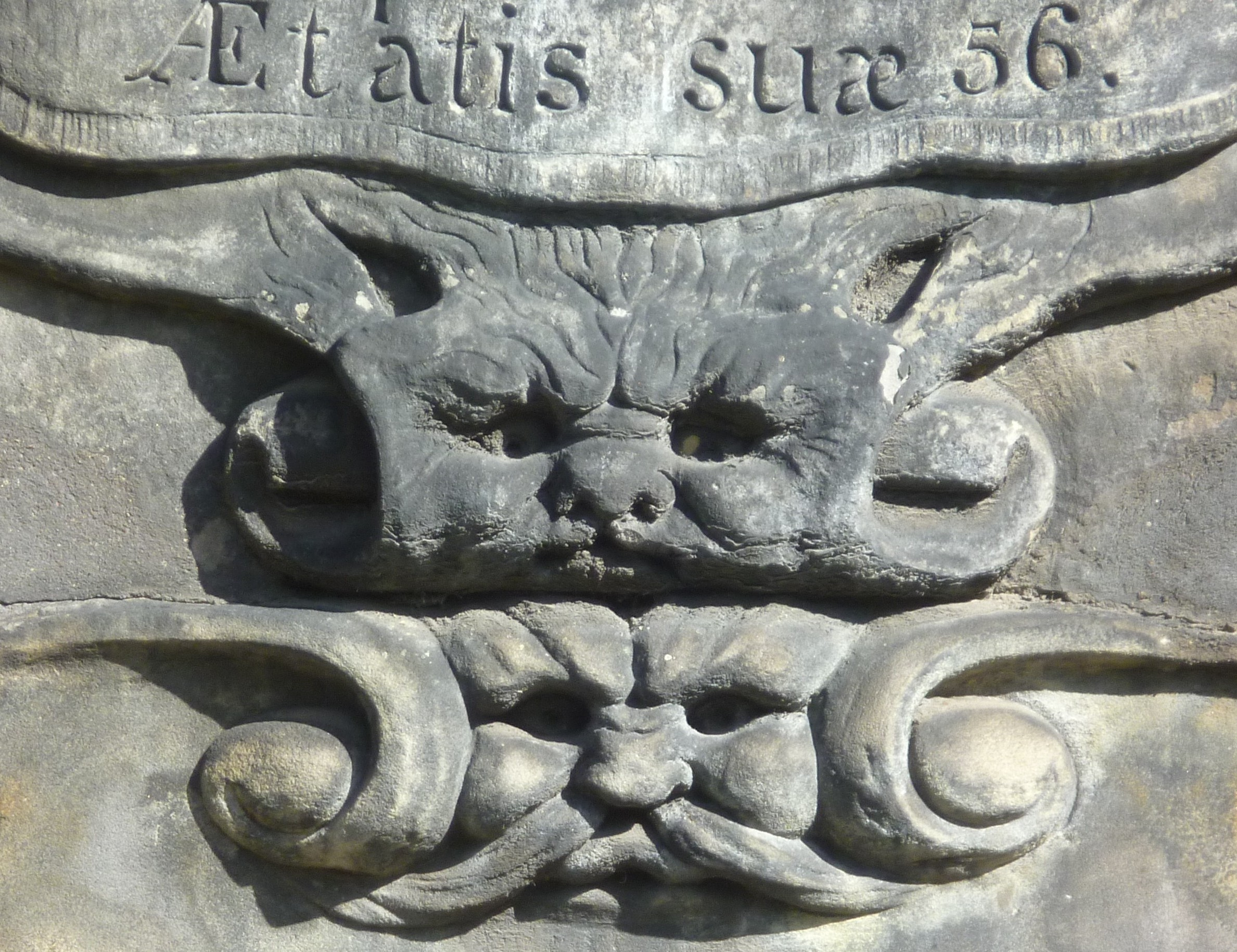
Detail from the John Mylne Monument in Greyfriars Kirkyard. The text reads ...Aetatis Suae 56, because he died at age 56.

In architecture the term "grotesque" means a carved stone figure.

Grotesques are often confused with gargoyles, but the distinction is that gargoyles are figures that contain a water spout through the mouth, while grotesques do not. Without a water spout, this type of sculpture is also known as a chimera when it depicts fantastical creatures. In the Middle Ages, the term babewyn was used to refer to both gargoyles and grotesques. This word is derived from the Italian word babbuino, which means "baboon".

== In typography ==
The word "grotesque", or "Grotesk" in German ("Grotesk" is also a less prevalent variant spelling of "grotesque"), is also frequently used as a synonym for sans-serif in typography. At other times, it is used (along with "neo-grotesque", "humanist", "lineal", and "geometric") to describe a particular style or subset of sans-serif typefaces. The origin of this association can be traced back to English typefounder William Thorowgood, who introduced the term "grotesque" and in 1835 produced 7-line pica grotesque—the first sans-serif typeface containing actual lowercase letters. An alternate etymology is possibly based on the original reaction of other typographers to such a strikingly featureless typeface.

Popular grotesque typefaces include Franklin Gothic, News Gothic, Haettenschweiler, and Lucida Sans (although the latter lacks the spurred "G"), whereas popular neo-grotesque typefaces include Arial, Helvetica, and Verdana.

== See also ==
- Ero guro
- Fractal
- Grotesque (architecture)
- Caricature
- Hunky punk
- Mask
- Mummers' play
- Rigoletto, an opera by Giuseppe Verdi
- Sheela na Gig
