= Claude Lilly =

American academic administrator and business executive

17th President of Presbyterian College
- In office July 15, 2012 – July 15, 2015
- Preceded by: John V. Griffith
- Succeeded by: Bob Staton

Personal details
- Born: 1946 (age 79–80)
- Children: 2
- Education: Georgia State University

Claude Clifford Lilly III (born June 1946) is an American educator, insurance executive, and academic administrator that served as the 17th president of Presbyterian College in Clinton, South Carolina.

== Early life and education ==
Claude Clifford Lilly III was born in June 1946. He received his bachelors, masters, and doctoral degrees from Georgia State University, the latter in risk management.

== Career ==
=== Teaching and administrative positions ===
Lilly has held teaching positions at multiple institutions, including Texas Tech University, the University of Southern California, and Florida State University. He served as the Dean of the College of Business Administration at the University of North Carolina at Charlotte, and as the Dean of the College of Business and Behavioral Science at Clemson University before accepting the top job at Presbyterian.

During Lilly's time at Clemson, he served as the chair of the Charlotte Branch of the Federal Reserve Bank of Richmond.

=== Presidency of Presbyterian College ===
It was announced on June 15, 2012, that Lilly had been unanimously elected by the Presbyterian College board of trustees to serve as the college's next president. Lilly assumed office on July 15, 2012, succeeding John V. Griffith.

During his presidency, Lilly led an $11.8 million campaign to renovate Neville Hall, the college's main academic building. He also led the "swift response" to the flooding of a dormitory on campus, and oversaw the graduation of the first two classes from Presbyterian's School of Pharmacy.

It was announced on June 9, 2015, that Lilly had been elected to serve as the vice president of the Big South Conference.

On June 30, 2015, Lilly informed the college that he would resign as president effective July 15, 2015. He did not give a reason for this decision. His term ended three years to the day from taking office, and he was succeeded by Bob Staton.

== Personal life ==
Lilly has two children.

Academic offices
| Preceded by John V. Griffith | President of Presbyterian College; 2012 — 2015 | Succeeded by Bob Staton |
| Preceded by David W. Grigsby | Dean of the Clemson University; College of Business; 2007 — 2012 | Succeeded by Charles K. Watt |
