= Matthew vandenBerg =

American academic administrator and business executive

17th President of Ohio Wesleyan University
- Incumbent
- Assumed office July 1, 2023
- Preceded by: Rock F. Jones

19th President of Presbyterian College
- In office February 1, 2021 – June 30, 2023
- Preceded by: Bob Staton
- Succeeded by: Anita Gustafson

Personal details
- Spouse: Melissa
- Children: 2
- Education: Alma College (BA); Indiana University (MPA); University of Pennsylvania (EdD)

Matthew vandenBerg is an American academic administrator serving as the 17th president of Ohio Wesleyan University in Delaware, Ohio. He formerly served as the vice president for advancement and external relations at Alma College in Alma, Michigan, and as the president of Presbyterian College in Clinton, South Carolina.

== Early life and education ==
vandenBerg graduated from Alma College with a Bachelor of Arts degree in 2002. He then earned a Master of Public Affairs degree from the O'Neill School of Public and Environmental Affairs at Indiana University Bloomington and a Doctor of Education degree from the University of Pennsylvania.

== Career ==
Before being involved in higher education, vandenBerg had a number of roles. He served as an assistant vice president at fundraising management firm CCS Fundraising, and as a spokesperson for the chairman of the United States House Permanent Select Committee on Intelligence.

He has worked in higher education in alumni relations at Indiana University Bloomington and as a director of development at Albion College in Albion, Michigan, before taking a position at his alma mater, Alma College, as the vice president for advancement and external relations.

vandenBerg assumed the presidency of Presbyterian College on February 1, 2021, after he was named President-elect on October 28, 2020. He succeeded interim president Don Raber, who took office following Bob Staton's resignation on December 31, 2020.

vandenBerg is a signatory of "A Call for Constructive Engagement", a letter signed by hundreds of other college leaders in protest against Donald Trump's actions against higher education.

Academic offices
Preceded by Rock F. Jones	President of Ohio Wesleyan University; 2023 — present	Succeeded by Incumbent
Preceded by Bob Staton	President of Presbyterian College; 2021 — 2023	Succeeded by Anita Gustafson
