= John V. Griffith =

American administrator (born 1947)

16th President of Presbyterian College
- In office January 1, 1998 – July 15, 2012
- Preceded by: Kenneth B. Orr
- Succeeded by: Claude Lilly

15th President of Lyon College
- In office August 1, 1989 – December 31, 1997
- Preceded by: Dan C. West
- Succeeded by: Walter B. Roettger

Personal details
- Born: December 24, 1947 (age 78)
- Spouse: Nancy Snell (m. 1969)
- Education: Dickinson College; Harvard University; Syracuse University

John Vincent Griffith (born December 24, 1947) is an American former educator and academic administrator. He took his first administrative position at Davidson College and left after being appointed president of Lyon College in Batesville, Arkansas, a role he held for eight years. At Lyon, his administration constructed and renovated several residential and academic buildings. In 1998, he became president of Presbyterian College in Clinton, South Carolina. There, academic and athletic facilities were improved or built and the college transitioned to NCAA Division I status. During his tenure, the college began its Confucius Institute and opened a pharmacy school. He was president at Presbyterian for fourteen years until his retirement in July 2012.

== Early life and education ==
John Vincent Griffith was born on December 24, 1947. He was raised in Hamilton, New York; his father was dean of students at Colgate University. Griffith attended Hamilton Central School.

Griffith earned a Bachelor of Arts degree in religion from Dickinson College in Carlisle, Pennsylvania. He earned a Master of Divinity degree, magna cum laude, from Harvard University, and he earned a Ph.D. from Syracuse University. His research focus was intellectual development.

== Career ==
Following his graduation from Syracuse, Griffith took his first teaching position at the Dana Hall School, where he was also the chaplain. After leaving Dana Hall, he was a member of the faculty at Syracuse University and the University of Michigan before taking a faculty position at Davidson College. He was also a part of the Davidson administration as dean of admissions and financial aid and then as vice president for institutional advancement for his final four years there. He left Davidson after ten years upon his appointment as president of Arkansas College in Batesville, Arkansas. Griffith's appointment was announced on December 4, 1988, and he took office on August 1, 1989, succeeding Dan C. West.

At Arkansas College, which changed its name to Lyon College in 1994, Griffith's administration oversaw the construction and renovation of multiple campus buildings, including the president's house, a residence hall, and the Lyon Business and Economics Building, between 1991 and 1994. Griffith was elected president of Presbyterian College, in Clinton, South Carolina, by a unanimous vote of the school's board of trustees on June 3, 1997. He stepped down as president of Lyon effective December 31, 1997, and took office at Presbyterian on January 1, 1998, succeeding Kenneth B. Orr. He was succeeded at Lyon by Walter B. Roettger. Griffith's formal inauguration at Presbyterian was held October 10, 1998.

During Griffith's tenure at Presbyterian, the school constructed or renovated several academic buildings, including Lassiter Hall and the college library. A new soccer stadium, Martin Stadium at Edens Field, and a new football stadium, Bailey Memorial Stadium, were also built in 2001 and 2002, respectively. His administration established a partnership with Guizhou University, in Guiyang, Guizhou, China; this led to the establishment of the Confucius Institute at Presbyterian. Additionally, the school announced a move to NCAA Division I athletics in 2006, and established the Presbyterian College School of Pharmacy in 2010. He contributed to the founding of the Promise and Challenge Campaign, a $160 million fundraising campaign.

In 2010, Griffith's salary from Presbyterian totaled $290,045. He resigned the presidency effective July 15, 2012, and was succeeded by Claude Lilly.

During his career, Griffith chaired the South Carolina Independent Colleges and Universities president's council, the Association of Presbyterian Colleges and Universities, and a governing council within the Aspen Institite. He was director of the Laurens County, South Carolina, chamber of commerce, and he was a board member for the National Association of Independent Colleges and Universities.

== Personal life ==
Griffith married Nancy Snell, of Tunkhannock, Pennsylvania, in 1969. The couple has two children. Griffith is an ordained minister in the Presbyterian Church (USA).

Griffith received an honorary Doctor of Humane Letters degree from Lyon in 2001.
