= Jessica Anthony =

American author

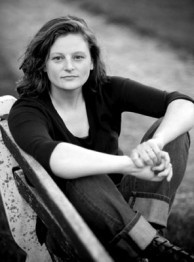
- Education: Hamilton Central School; Bates College (BA); University of Manchester; George Mason University (MFA)
- Occupation: Author
- Writing career
- Genre: Satire
- Notable work: Enter the Aardvark
- Notable awards: Guggenheim Fellowship (2026)
- Website: thejessicaanthony.com

Jessica Anthony is an American novelist, and author of The Convalescent (2009), Chopsticks (2012), Enter the Aardvark (2020) and The Most (2024). In addition to writing, Anthony has held a series of diverse occupations across the globe ranging from butcher in Sitka, Alaska, unlicensed masseuse in Rytro, Poland, and secretary in San Francisco, California. In 2017, Anthony worked on The Most while stationed as a "Bridge Guard" during an art residency program, guarding the Mária Valéria Bridge between Štúrovo, Slovakia and Esztergom, Hungary. She resides in Maine and teaches at Bates College.

== Early life and education ==
Anthony was born in Oneida, New York. She attended Hamilton Central School, where her mother taught Latin. She attended Bates College and studied abroad at the University of Manchester (UK), earning a BA in English literature. While at Manchester, she studied literature with Professor Michael Schmidt. In 2004, she received an MFA in fiction from George Mason University, where she studied with novelists Susan Shreve, Alan Cheuse, Richard Bausch, and Stephen Goodwin.

Anthony had several jobs before becoming a novelist. She worked at Sea Mart in Sitka, Alaska, where she was a butcher and rented videos. She taught English in the remote villages Rytro and Rygrot, Poland, and to Czech businessmen in Prague. She worked as a custodian, cleaning college dorms in upstate New York, and was a secretary in San Francisco and New York City.

== Career ==
Anthony's debut novel, The Convalescent, tells the story of Rovar Pliegman, a Hungarian-American who sells meat out of a bus. The novel is a farcical re-telling of the history of the Hungarian people and satirizes contemporary American suburbia. The novel was published by McSweeneys in 2009 and won McSweeneys inaugural Amanda Davis Highwire Fiction Award.

Her second novel, Chopsticks, coauthored with graphic designer Rodrigo Corral, was published by Penguin/Razorbill in 2012. Chopsticks is "a multimedia narrative about a piano prodigy told through words, pictures and memorabilia", published as both a traditional book and an app, was featured in The Wall Street Journal and won Apps Magazine's (UK) "App of the Year".

Enter the Aardvark, published in March 2020, sold in a six-house auction to Little, Brown & Co. The novel follows a closeted Republican congressman and a Victorian taxidermied aardvark that ends up in his possession, and was called "an ingenious political satire" by The Guardian. The novel was a finalist for the New England Book Award in Fiction, a The New York Times Editors' Choice, and was featured in Time Magazine.

Anthony's short stories have appeared in Best New American Voices, Best American Nonrequired Reading, McSweeney’s, New American Writing, among other places.

Her novel, The Most, was published by Little, Brown & Co. and Doubleday UK in July 2024. It was longlisted for the National Book Award for Fiction in September 2024. In 2025, she was promoted to senior lecturer in English at Bates College. Anthony is a 2026 Guggenheim Fellow.

== Bibliography ==
- The Convalescent (McSweeney's/Grove), 2009
- Chopsticks (Razorbill), multimedia novel collaboration with designer Rodrigo Corral, 2012
- Enter the Aardvark (Little, Brown and Co./Penguin RandomHouse UK), 2020
- The Most (Little, Brown & Co./Doubleday UK), 2024

== Awards and honors ==
- Guggenheim Fellowship, 2026
- Longlisted for the National Book Award for Fiction, 2024
- Barnes and Noble's Monthly Pick in Fiction, 2024
- Finalist, the New England Book Award in Fiction, 2021
- Best of 2020, Esquire Magazine
- 100 Must-Read Books of 2020, Time Magazine
- Recipient of Creative Capital Award in Literature, 2013
- McSweeney's "Amanda Davis Highwire Fiction Award," 2005
- Barnes and Noble's "Discover Great New Writers"
- 2010 ALA Notable Books for Adults
