= Enter the Aardvark =

2020 novel by Jessica Anthony

- First edition
- Author: Jessica Anthony
- Language: English
- Genre: Satire
- Published: 2020 (Little, Brown and Co.)
- Pages: 192 (first edition, hardcover)
- ISBN: 978-0-316-53615-8

Enter the Aardvark is an American satirical novel by Jessica Anthony originally published in 2020.

== Plot summary ==
The novel follows two related stories of repressed love connected via a giant taxidermied aardvark. One strand of the novel is set in modern-day Washington, D.C and chronicles freshman Rep. Alexander Paine Wilson's receipt of the stuffed aardvark via a mysterious FedEx dropoff. This event sets in motion a satirical chain of events for the neo-Reaganite congressman preparing for a reelection campaign. A separate thread set in Victorian-era London tells the story of Titus Downing, the taxidermist who originally stuffed and displayed the aardvark. The two stories weave together similarities and secrets the men share across time and space.

== Publication history ==
Enter the Aardvark was first published in hardcover in the United States by Little, Brown and Company on March 24, 2020. It was released in the United Kingdom by Penguin Random House on April 23, 2020.

== Reception ==
=== Literary criticism ===
Anthony received favorable reviews across a number of newspapers and online media include The New York Times Book Review, Los Angeles Times, Time, The Guardian, Esquire, and Los Angeles Review of Books. Maggie Lange reviewing for the Los Angeles Times compared the novel to Vladimir Nabokov's Pnin as well as political satires such as HBO's television show Veep and Christopher Buckley's novel Thank You For Smoking.

=== Awards and recognition ===
The novel featured on a number of year-end book review lists including Time's The 100 Must Read Books of 2020 and The A.V. Club's 15 favorite books of 2020.
