= La maschera e il volto =

Play written by Luigi Chiarelli

La maschera e il volto is a comedy of grotesque genre by Luigi Chiarelli. Written in 1913 and first presented in 1916, it is historically significant for starting the contemporary grotesque theatre. It had a great success first in Italy and then internationally, and continues to be represented. Several movies have been adapted from the play.
