= Rock F. Jones =

American academic administrator

Rock Jones

16th President of Ohio Wesleyan University
- In office July 1, 2008 – July 1, 2023
- Preceded by: Mark Huddleston
- Succeeded by: Matthew vandenBerg

Personal details
- Born: Rockwell F. Jones
- Education: Hendrix College (BA); Duke University (MDiv); University of Texas at Austin (PhD)

Rockwell F. Jones is an American academic administrator who was most recently the 16th president of Ohio Wesleyan University in Delaware, Ohio. Jones was formally inaugurated on October 10, 2008, although he served as president of the university beginning on July 1, 2008. His term ended on July 1, 2023.

== Education ==
Jones earned a Bachelor of Arts degree from Hendrix College, a M.Div. from the Duke University Divinity School, where he graduated magna cum laude, and a Ph.D. in educational administration from the University of Texas at Austin.

== Career ==
Before beginning his tenure as president, Jones held the served as executive vice president and dean of advancement at Hendrix College in Conway, Arkansas. Jones also served as vice president for enrollment and dean of admission and financial aid, interim vice president for student affairs, and chaplain at Hendrix. In April 2022, it was announced that Jones would retire at the end of the following academic year.
