= Bob Staton =

American academic administrator and business executive

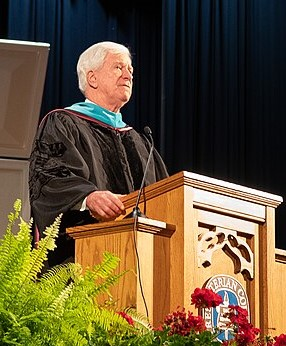
- Staton in 2019

18th President of Presbyterian College
- In office July 15, 2015 – December 31, 2020
- Preceded by: Claude Lilly
- Succeeded by: Matthew vandenBerg

Personal details
- Spouse: Phyllis Staton
- Children: 4
- Education: Presbyterian College; University of South Carolina School of Law (J.D.)

Robert Emmett Staton is an American academic administrator and former business executive who served as the 18th president of Presbyterian College in Clinton, South Carolina. He is the former chairman and CEO of Colonial Life & Accident Insurance Company.

== Early life and education ==
Staton attended Presbyterian College, graduated in 1968, and the University of South Carolina School of Law, graduated in 1971.

== Career ==
Staton served as the chairman and CEO of Colonial Life & Accident Insurance Company until the late 1990s. After retiring from that position, he joined the board of trustees at Presbyterian, a position in which he served from 1997 until 2006.

He served as PC's executive vice president for external relations from 2007 to 2012. On July 1, 2015, one day after Presbyterian president Claude Lilly announced his intention to resign, Staton was named as the interim replacement and was later announced as the permanent president of the college, taking office on July 15, 2015. It was announced on May 12, 2020, that Staton would retire effective December 31, 2020.

Staton was awarded an honorary Doctorate of Public Service at Presbyterian's 2015 commencement.

=== Run for State Superintendent of Education ===
On January 4, 2006, Staton announced his candidacy for the position of South Carolina State Superintendent of Education. He finished second in a contested Republican primary and conceded the race on June 14, 2006, having received just shy of 35% of the vote compared to Karen Floyd's 50.5%.

2006 South Carolina State Superintendent of Education Republican primary
Party	Candidate	Votes	%
Republican	Karen Floyd	120,684	50.5
Republican	Bob Staton	82,777	34.6
Republican	Mike Ryan	17,332	7.3
Republican	Elizabeth Moffly	10,995	4.6
Republican	Kerry Wood	7,156	3
Total votes		238,944	100

== Personal life ==
Staton is married to his wife, Phyllis, a former manager at Palmetto Health, with whom he has four children. Staton currently serves as an elder at Cherokee Presbyterian Church, located in Gilbert, South Carolina.

Academic offices
Preceded by Claude Lilly	President of Presbyterian College; 2015 — 2020	Succeeded by Matthew vandenBerg
