= Hamilton Central School =

High school in New York, United States

Coordinates: 42.821037°N 75.547357°W

Hamilton Central School Emerald Knights

Hamilton Central School, located on West Kendrick Avenue in Hamilton, New York was established in 1946. It educates students in kindergarten through grade 12, with an average class size of 45 and a teacher to student ratio of 1:10.

== Newspaper ==
Hamilton boasts an award-winning school paper. The Emerald Press has been coming out weekly since 1990, and has won several awards in national competitions.

== Theater activities ==
The middle and high schools present two productions a year, usually a play in the fall and a musical in the spring.

== Athletics ==
Hamilton Central School is in the Class D division for sports. It has won five state championships in the last 15 years, and more state titles than any other school in the central New York area.

The men's basketball team won states in the 1993–94 season, mostly because of Adonal Foyle. Foyle continued his basketball career with three years at Colgate University (1995–98), and played mostly for the Golden State Warriors in the NBA. He also played for the Orlando Magic and Memphis Grizzlies. He retired in 2009.

Hamilton Central School has won a number of state championships in various sports.

Hamilton Central School state championships
Sport	Hamilton	Opponent
Boys' soccer (2011)	Hamilton 1	Chazy 0
Cross country (2010)	Sage Hurta (seventh grader)	19:59.8 to win by 14 seconds
Boys' soccer (2008)	#3 Hamilton 4	#7 Chazy 3
Girls' soccer (2001)	Hamilton 1	Ellicottville 0
Boys' basketball (2000)	#2 Hamilton 91	#3 Alexander Hamilton 86: 3 overtimes - longest game in NY State boys' tournament history
Boys' soccer (1997)	Hamilton 1	Jasper-Troupsburg 0
Boys' soccer (1995)	Hamilton 1	Faith Heritage 0
Boys' basketball (1994)	Hamilton 59	Tuckahoe 39

== Notable alumni ==
- Adonal Foyle - professional basketball player
- John V. Griffith - former president of Lyon College and Presbyterian College
- Sage Hurta - professional track and field athlete
- Matt Malloy - actor
