= List of presidents of Ohio Wesleyan University =

This article lists the current and past presidents of Ohio Wesleyan University in Delaware, Ohio.

The president of Ohio Wesleyan University is the institution's chief administrator and ex officio chair of the Board of Trustees. The president is appointed by and is responsible to the other members of the Board, who delegate to him the day-to-day running of the university. Since Wesleyan's beginning, just 17 men have held the title of Ohio Wesleyan University president, while a few have served as interim president. Those who have held the office include lawyers, literary scholars, politicians, businessmen and clergymen.

Matthew P. vandenBerg, Ed.D., became Ohio Wesleyan's 17th president when he took office July 1, 2023. vandenBerg succeeded President Rock Jones, Ph.D., who retired at the end of the 2022-2023 academic year after serving 15 years in the role.

== History ==
The service of Ohio Wesleyan's presidents to the college spans nearly 170 years now. About a quarter of them, in the beginning of the college's history, were appointed by the Methodist church. Early in the beginning of the 20th century that link was severed and the appointment of Arthur Flemming marked the beginning of independent appointment to the position of presidency of the college.

=== The Thomson Era ===
The first president Edward Thomson, one of the two founders of the university in 1842. His father, a druggist, influenced Edward toward the study of medicine, which he pursued at the University of Pennsylvania. He retained the post of the presidency until 1860. Thomson was a vocal clergyman and a defender of the rights of women to co-education, on equal terms with men, and engaged in antislavery activity at that time, including many acts of civil disobedience.

On August 5, 1846, Thomson delivered his inaugural address. He maintained that the college was a product of the liberality of the people of Delaware and that it was fortunate that Ohio Wesleyan was founded in a community divided in religious and political opinions because the friction of a mixed society prevented dogmatism and developed energy and pointed out that the spirit of the college is the spirit of liberty.

Accounts of Thomson focus on his scholarly work and his firm anti-slavery social stance. By the end of the presidency, Thomson had written three books on 18th century Europe and Asia. He helped to give the campus a certain abolitionist tinge of reform, as was the case with Oberlin College, along these lines by stating that the school would not obey the fugitive slave law and would be willing to suffer the extreme penalty in case of need.

=== Merrick through Welch ===
Under Frederick Merrick's presidency (1860–1873), the school focused as much on curriculum expansion as it did on fundraising. Less teacher than some of the others, Merrick's zeal significantly increased the school's coffers, but disappointment followed at the failure of his attempt to abolish fraternities in 1870-1872 and anxiety during the years of the construction of Merrick Hall. Charles Payne's presidency lasted between 1876 and 1888. He was an 1856 Wesleyan University alumnus graduate and during his presidency, enrollment in the college increased three times and music education experienced a decided renaissance. While no major buildings were built during his administration, Paynes' fame was strongly related to his reputation of being a disciplinarian.

The Payne age of transition, was followed by Bashford's era of transformation during 1889-1904. The need of new departments and the value of specialized instruction were recognized. Bashford's aim was to improve the plant and offerings of the college; to make the school's curriculum and buildings on par with its new academic position. The building history during that period included Monnett extensions, University Hall and Slocum Library. Athletics and physical education facilities were established and a start was made for a new gymnasium. Development during the Bashford years meant establishments of departments for natural science (physics, zoology, geology), and new departments of speech, history, French, English and economics. The new ideal of specialization brought an emphasis on professional preparation on the Doctor of Philosophy degree and on travel and study in Europe. Three professional schools were established during his presidency (of Law, of Medicine and of Theology) and the Doric Front was demolished.

During the 1920s, under Herbert George Welch's and John W. Hoffman's presidencies chapel service was dropped, sororities came in. Edgar Hall came into use and Selby Stadium was built; Austin Manor and Perkins Observatory was constructed and Stuyvesant Hall was planned.

=== Wenzlau's presidency controversies ===
The presidency of Thomas Wenzlau span three decades between 1969-1984. The first challenge for Wenzlau was campus unrest: Wesleyan students took over the ROTC building, demanded its shut-down and eventually eliminated its presence in 1970. Students demanded participation in departmental meetings and faculty committees. The period saw a furthering of the democratic process in the governance of Wesleyan. His presidency witnessed decline in students' test scores, an unusually high attrition rate, lack of adequate research to identify potential major donors and a growing "party school" image, leading to a rocky relationship between him and the student body. In 1979-1982, the campus newspaper The Transcript severely criticized Wenzlau's presidency blaming it for "severely affecting the reputation of the college". The exchange between the president and The Transcript led to a Washington Post report on the school that eventually led to the end of Wenzlau's presidency.

=== Wesleyan's reputation on the rebound with Warren ===
The leadership of David Liles Warren increased admission standards for students, engaged students in a "live-in" presidency, expanded media exposure and established a National Colloquium, whose objective was to focus on the liberal arts. Warren engaged in forty-one interviews on the ABC and NBC networks.

=== Mark Huddleston to the present ===
Mark Huddleston, was elected after a Board meeting on June 12, 2004. He succeeded Thomas Courtice, who held office for 10 years. Huddleston's specializes in public administration, a field in which he has published widely, focusing on the senior federal career service and a variety of international issues. Before coming to Ohio Wesleyan, Huddleston served in the faculty of the University of Delaware for 24 years, ultimately as the Dean of the College of Arts and Sciences. Huddleston has been an active consultant for both the U.S. government and international organizations in the past. He worked previously in the Balkans, southern Africa, and central and southeast Asia. He gained international development experience in Bosnia as an advisor on rebuilding financial and administrative infrastructures following the Dayton Accords. He has authored the following books: The Public Administration Workbook, Profiles in Excellence: Conversations with the Best of America's Career Executive Service, The Higher Civil Service in the United States, and The Government's Managers.

Under Huddleston, Wesleyan continued to undertake construction projects. The Memorial Union Building was renovated in 2001 to accommodate the Economics Department, the Academic Resource Center, the Information Systems department, and the Woltemade Center for Economics, Business and Entrepreneurship. The Conrades-Wetherell Science Center opened in 2004 to provide 52,000 square feet (4,800 m^{2}) of additional space for the science departments.

An athletic fundraising campaign began in 2005. The campaign is named after Branch Rickey, class of 1904, who broke the racial barrier in professional baseball. It is directed at renovating the facilities used by the 22 varsity teams by adding a new turf facility, new field house and a pool, and a gateway connecting all sports facilities on campus.

In April 2007, Huddleston accepted a position as president of the University of New Hampshire and left Wesleyan on June 30, 2007, giving him the second shortest presidential reign in Wesleyan's history, behind David Lockmiller, 1959–1961. On 29 May 2007, the appointment of current university provost Dr. David O. Robbins as interim president was unanimously endorsed by OWU's Board of Trustees. Dr. Robbins' term as Interim President began on 1 July 2007.

== List of presidents ==
#	Image	President	Wesleyan Class	Tenure	Life	Events
1		Edward Thomson	--	1842–1860	1810–1870	--
2		Frederick Merrick	--	1860–1873	1810–1894	--
–		Lorenzo Dow McCabe	--	1873–1876	1817–1897	Acting/Interim
3		Charles H. Payne	--	1876–1888	1830–1899	Wesleyan Female College merged with Ohio Wesleyan University
–		Lorenzo Dow McCabe	--	1888–1889	1817–1897	Acting/Interim
4		James Whitford Bashford	--	1889–1904	1849–1919	--
–		William F. Whitlock	--	1904–1905	1833–1909	Acting/Interim
5		Herbert George Welch	--	1905–1916	1862–1969	--
6		John W. Hoffman	--	1916–1928	1871–1953	--
7		Edmund D. Soper	--	1928–1938	1876–1961	Stuyvesant Hall built
–		Edward Loranus Rice	--	1938–1939	1871–1960	Acting/Interim
8		Herbert John Burgstahler	--	1939–1947	1886–1976	Last of long line of Methodist-appointed Presidents
–		Clarence E. Ficken	--	1947–1948	1894–1975	Acting/Interim
9		Arthur Sherwood Flemming	1927	1948–1953	1905–1996	--
–		Clarence E. Ficken	--	1953–1955	1894–1975	Acting/Interim
–		Frank J. Prout	1906	1955–1957	1883–1967	Acting/Interim
9		Arthur Sherwood Flemming	1927	1957–1958	1905–1996	--
–		George W. Burns	--	1958–1959	1913–1994	Acting/Interim
10		David Lockmiller	--	1959–1961	1907–2005	--
11		Elden T. Smith	1932	1962–1968	1910–2006	Residential Buildings significantly expanded - Smith, Welch and Lucy Hayes Dormitories built
–		Robert P. Lisensky	--	1968–1969	1928–2019	Acting/Interim
12		Thomas E. Wenzlau	1950	1969–1984	1927–2018	Branch Rickey Arena Built; Joint Statement on Rights and Freedoms of Students adopted Built
13		David L. Warren	--	1984–1993	--	Hamilton-Williams Campus Center Built
–		William C. Louthan	--	1993–1994	--	Acting/Interim
14		Thomas Courtice	--	1994–2004	born 1943	Science Center Built; Establishment of Five Colleges of Ohio, Fine Arts Center
15		Mark Huddleston	--	2004–2007	born 1950	Major $250 Million Campaign
–		David O. Robbins	--	2007–2008	--	Acting/Interim
16		Rock Jones	--	2008–2023	born 1958	Theory to Practice Grant Program; Renovation of Merrick Hall; Renovation of Slocum Hall
17		Matthew vandenBerg	--	2023–present	--	Closure of Beeghly Library for remodel, Reconstruction of Panhellenic House into 1842

=== Female College presidents ===
Ohio Wesleyan Female College had three presidents before merging with Ohio Wesleyan University.

- Oran Faville, 1853–1855
- Nathaniel Clark Burt, 1868–1870
- William Richardson, 1873–1877
