= History of Ohio Wesleyan University =

The history of Ohio Wesleyan University began with discussions of a college in Ohio in 1821 when the Ohio Methodist Conference in connection with the Kentucky Conference had established Augusta, the first Methodist institution of higher learning in the United States. But Augusta was an obscure village, quite inaccessible and especially because it was on the "wrong" side of the Ohio River to suit the growing anti-slavery sentiments of the people of Ohio.

== Founders ==
The part of the Olentangy River now occupied by Delaware hosted a Delaware Native American village prior to the founding of the town in 1808. The Delawares called themselves Lenape or Leni-lenape, equivalent to "real men," or "native, genuine men" and were called "Grandfathers" by the Algonquian tribes because of their belief that the Delawares were the oldest and original Algonquian nation. During the American Revolution, the Delawares became a divided people. Many attempted to remain neutral in the conflict. Some adopted Christianity, while other Delawares supported the English, who had assumed the role of the French traders at the end of the French and Indian War. These natives thanked England for the Proclamation of 1763, which prohibited colonists from settling any further west than the Appalachian Mountains, and feared that, if the Americans were victorious, the Delawares would be driven from their lands. Following the American victory in the Revolution, the Delawares struggled against whites as they moved onto the natives' territory. In 1829, the Delawares relinquished their remaining land in Ohio and moved to present-day Kansas.

The desire to establish an institution of higher learning was discussed for several years but did not assume a practical form until The White Sulphur Spring Property, a sanatorium in Delaware, Ohio, was offered for sale in the summer of 1841. The property, which covered 10 acres (40,000 m^{2}) of land with the former Mansion House and a few other buildings, was bought on November 17, 1841, by the committee of Ohio citizens for $10,000.00, and the payment was concluded in 1849.

James Cobb, an ex-army officer and a graduate of West Point, was the first informal principal of the preparatory school for both girls and boys. At the end of 1841, he retired from teaching due to his poor health conditions.

The following year, the state legislature of Ohio, under an old Ohio state constitution, granted a special charter to the new school on March 7, 1842.

On March 7, 1842, the founders formed a board of trustees and secured a charter, edited by a local resident Joseph Trimble, from the Ohio legislature. The charter established wide powers to a board comprising twenty-one members. The charter emphasized the democratic spirit of freedom of teaching.

Following the formal recognition by the state, the school appointed its first principal, Solomon Howard, and the formally recognized school unofficially opened its doors on November 1, 1842, six months later after the school obtained its official charter. The enrollment on November 1 comprised four boys. However, it increased to 130 students by the end of 1842, a number comprising students of both genders.

The school officially opened its doors on November 13, 1844, as a Methodist-related but nonsectarian college under the name Ohio Wesleyan University. It was among the first of a number of institutions named for Methodism founder John Wesley. The college originally admitted only male students, and began with twenty-nine students and three professors. The renamed Elliott Hall, formerly the Mansion House Hotel, served as an academic facility, recitation hall and a dormitory.

== Conception ==
The school started functioning as an institution of higher learning on November 13, 1844, when the College of Liberal Arts opened its doors. Edward Thompson headed the college. In addition to the college president, the school hired four more instructors. The first salaries of the school administrators were fixed at: $800 for the college president, $600 for college professors, and $400 for other instructors. November 13 was a rainy day and the surroundings were not pleasant. Apart from the senior class and the students in the preparatory school, the starting class was composed of male students only. The first-year class consisted of twenty-nine students. Of the twenty-nine students, at the end of 1844, two were juniors, two were sophomores, fourteen freshmen and ninety-two in the prep school.

The first graduating exercises occurred in 1846 when the school graduated one student with the degree A.B. The following year, the school graduated two students. The graduating class increased subsequently with the only interruption occurring with a two-year interruption during the Civil War when Wesleyan students participated on behalf of the Union Army.

On August 5, 1846, the first president, Edward Thomson, delivered his inaugural address. He stated that the college was a product of the liberality of the people of Delaware. He believed that Ohio Wesleyan was fortunate in that it was founded as a community divided in religious and political opinions because the friction of a mixed society prevented dogmatism, developed energy, and that the spirit of the college is the spirit of liberty.

Thomson and his successors were vocal in other political debates of the time, such as slavery and the expansion of the United States. In 1857, Edward Thomson denounced the argument that southern Christians "should retain their slaves in obedience to state laws forbidding manumission," saying that "the soft and slippered Christianity which disturbs no one, is not the Christianity of Christ."

The Ohio Wesleyan Female College was established in 1853. In 1857, the female college moved to Monnett Hall, named for school benefactress Mary Monnett Bain. In 1877, the female college merged with the university, which became coeducational. Monnett Hall remained the center for women's housing on campus well into the 20th century. The Monnett Garden, which now stands between Sanborn Hall and Austin Manor, was constructed in 1990 to honor the former Monnett Hall.

== Early leadership ==
Since the college was exclusively geared towards the needs of men from the very start, the Ohio Wesleyan Female College was chartered on April 1, 1853, also located in Delaware, Ohio. It graduated 411 graduated by its formal union with Ohio Wesleyan University on August 11, 1877. Since that date, the institution has been continuously and exclusively co-educational.

Early in its inception, the corporate powers of the college were vested in a board of twenty-one board members, the vast majority, seventy percent, at that time being laymen. In 1849, the number of the trustees, was increased to thirty-one.

The first president of the college after its formal charter, was Edward Thomson. He served the college until 1860 when moved to a position of a publication editor for a journal in New York City. He was succeeded by Frederick Merrick, elected in 1860 and serving until 1873 when he resigned on account of poor health. Between 1873 and 1876, Lorenzo McCabe, a senior professor at the college, administered the interim presidency until a new appointment

The third president was Charles Payne, who was elected in 1876. Under his presidency, the number of students doubled and the university assets increased to $500,000. He had a reputation for being a strict disciplinarian. Payne resigned in 1888 when he accepted the position of corresponding secretary of the Methodist Church in Ohio to which he was elected.

== Campus development ==
In the early years, the main central building for teaching purposes encompassed the former Mansion House. It was a Colonial style building, a former sanatorium, which was utilizing the fact that sulfur water was springing naturally from the grounds near the building. The Mansion House also served as a library, which contained several hundred books for about twelve to fifteen years since the college's conception. In 1856, a new temporary three-story brick building was built housing the expanding library collection. The brick building was eventually replaced when the Elihu Slocum Library was built in 1898. Another addition to the campus was University Hall built in 1893. By the turn of the century the campus comprised a total of thirteen buildings serving the various departments.

The female college, until its merge with the university, of 10 acres (40,000 m^{2}) consisted of a women's dormitory and a Music department, an adjoining tract containing the Arts Department, a President's House, an Observatory, the latter three buildings situated on land of about 50 acres (200,000 m^{2}). The university had no dormitories for men only.

The aggregate number of volumes in the library in the 1880s was 12,000. Most of the library and the museum collections focus on books in botany, zoology, mineralogy and geology.

== Academic degrees ==
Wesleyan was granting bachelors, master's and doctoral degrees until the turn of the century. For example, in 1897, the university conferred one-hundred and six bachelor's degrees, eleven master's, thirty-three doctor of medicine and two doctor of sacred theology.

The school continued to grant A.B.s for the students interested in the Classics course until 1868, when Ohio Wesleyan University began granting S.B. degrees for students interested in the study of sciences.

== Fundraising and curriculum ==
The Dartmouth College case, a case that questioned the constitutionality of the institution operating as a private college, had opened a wide range of freedom for the establishment of private or denominational schools, and the charter was issued by special legislative act. Wesleyan was founded as a result of an educational renaissance in Ohio, a process described as denomination-ridden, poverty-stricken...in fact not colleges at all, but glorified high schools or academies that presumed to offer degrees. However, in the early days the Methodist denomination constituted a minority among the school's graduates.

In the 1850s, Ohio Wesleyan was by a large majority Republican, a party at that time associated with anti-slavery and Unionism. On May 17, 1861, a huge flag was raised at a large concourse. In the annual celebrations for George Washington's birthday in 1862, a college seniors responded to the toasts for the college classes with an oration being our Republic: May she have a second Washington in her second revolution implicitly endorsing the ideals of democracy at stake.

During the mid-19th century, the school focused as on curriculum and fund raising. During this era, the college administration significantly increased the school's coffers, but failed to abolish fraternities. Between the years 1876 and 1888, enrollment in the college tripled and music education experienced a decided renaissance, though no major buildings were built during this time.

== Campus expansion ==
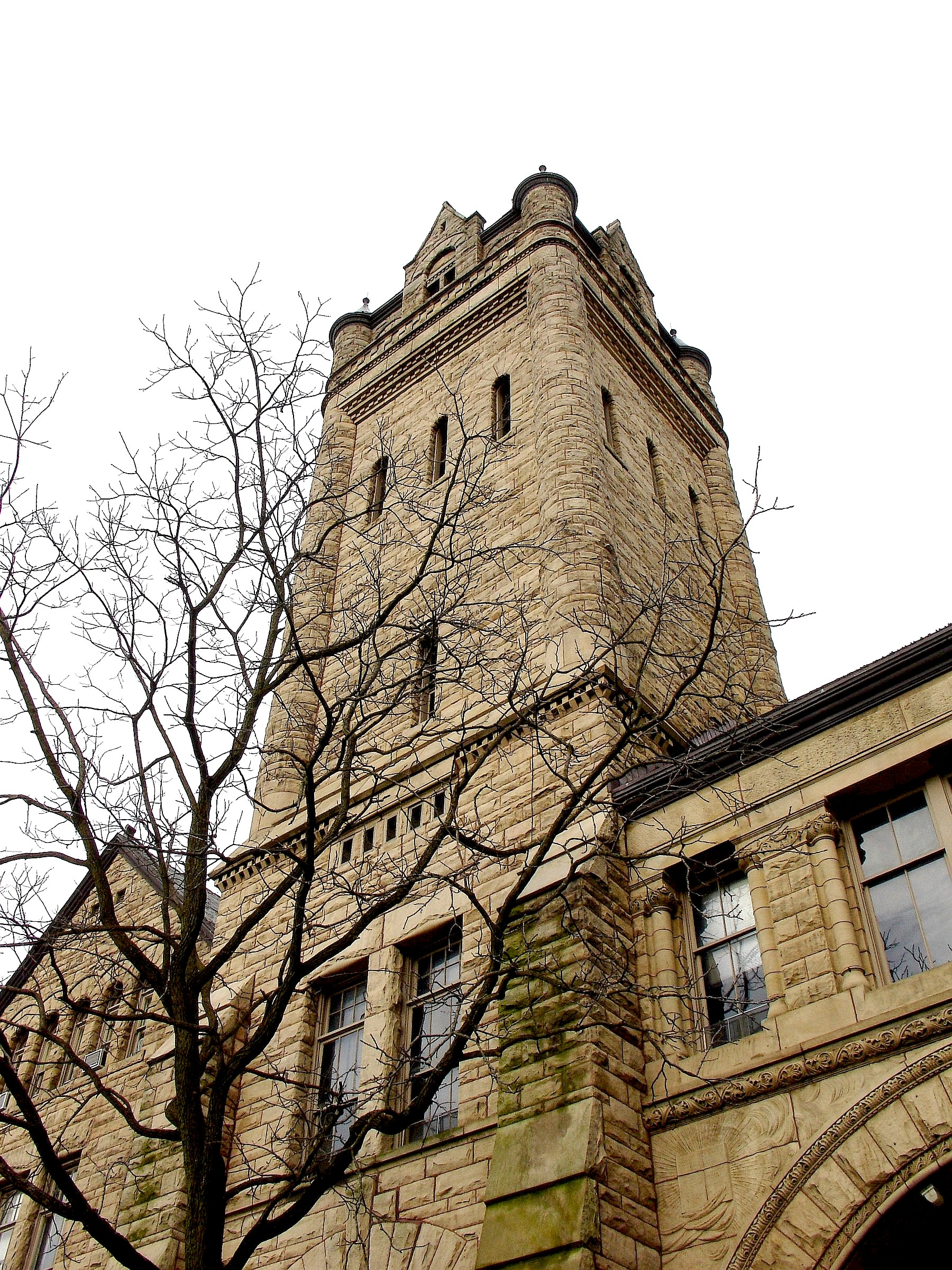
University Hall was built in 1893 on the academic quad featuring Neoromanesque architecture.

By the end of the 19th century, the university grew to contain several schools: a College of Liberal Arts (founded in 1844), a School of Music (1877), a School of Fine Arts (1877), a School of Oratory (1894), and a Business School (1895). Recognizing the need for new departments and the value of specialized instruction, the Ohio Wesleyan administration improved the college's facilities and offerings to make its curriculum and buildings on par with its new academic position. Construction during that period included Monnett extensions, University Hall and Slocum Library. Athletics and physical education facilities were established and a start was made for a new gymnasium.

During these years OWU added departments for natural science (physics, zoology, geology), speech, history, French, English and economics. The new ideal of specialization brought an emphasis on professional preparation for the Doctor of Philosophy degree and on travel and study in Europe. Three professional schools—Law, of Medicine and Theology—were formed and the Doric Front was demolished.

The specialization of the curriculum, a process that started during the Bashford presidency, influenced a lot of undergraduate students to take on further graduate study at other universities. Two Rhodes Scholars from Ohio Wesleyan were appointed during the first ten years of the 1910s: E.R.Loyd (1905) and E.E. Lincoln (1909). In 1907, the United Societes of Phi Beta Kappa, the oldest undergraduate honors organization in the United States installed its first chapter on campus.

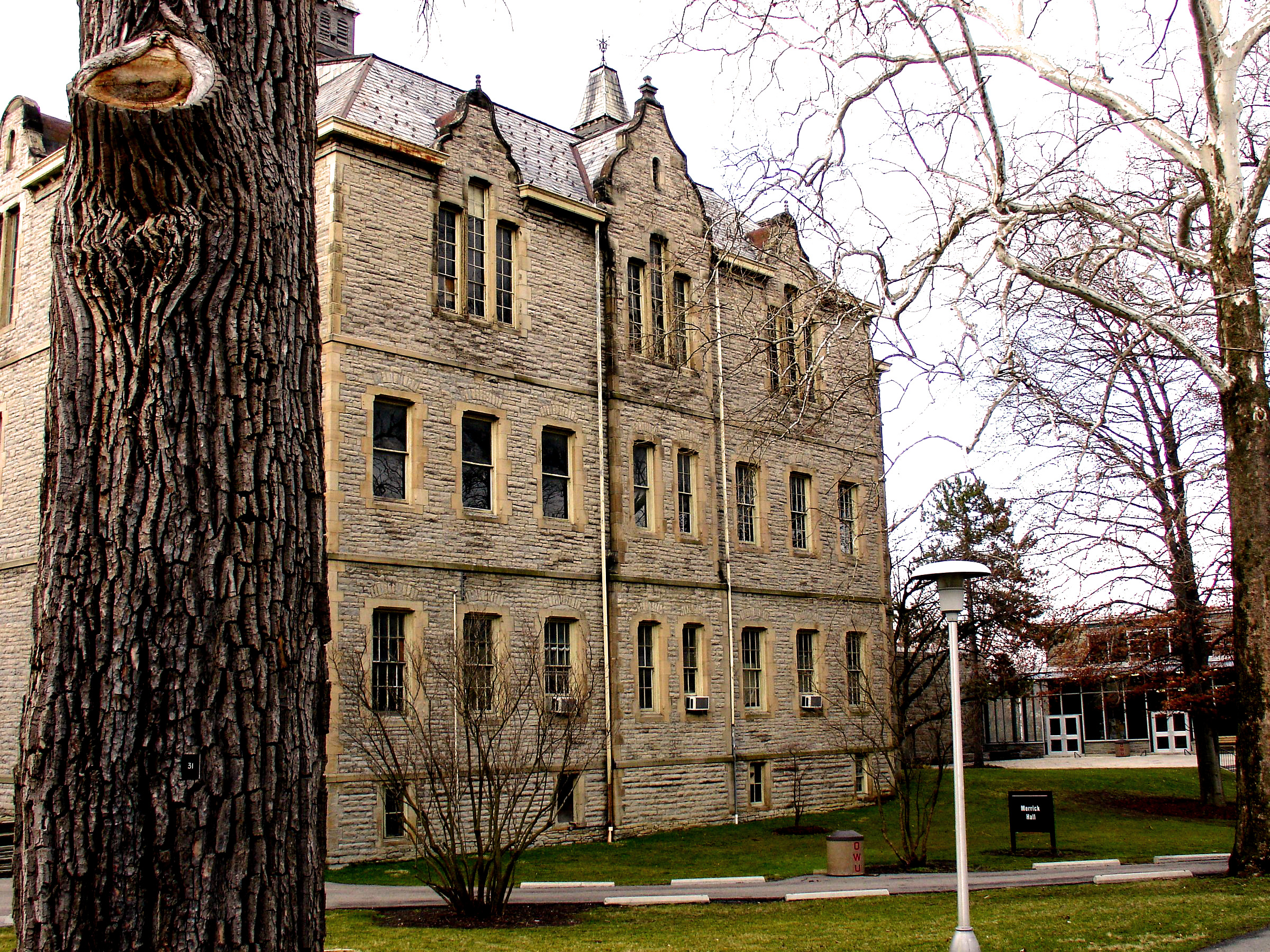
Merrick Hall, built in 1873, features Greek Revival architecture.

It was decided during the Welch presidency years that despite the expansion and the institution's name, Ohio Wesleyan University was to remain a college, not a university. In the interest of wider degree legitimacy, the Bachelor of Science degree was dropped and only the Bachelor of Arts was offered. The mantle of the old classical degree would be used to invoke a wide variety of fields, not just classical studies. Academic requirements for the bachelor's degree were cut and the emphasis on Latin and mathematics came to an end during the 1920s.

During the Hoffman years, the academy and the school of business came to an end in 1916. The academy had started in 1842 as a preparatory school and throughout its seventy-five years of existence frequently outnumbered the college in enrollment. The academy's demise was precipitated by the expansion of enrollment in public high schools and the Ohio centralized school system that started during the years of the Welch presidency. Decreasing demand for college preparatory services coincided with more stringent Department of Education conditions.

== Depression years ==
During the 1920s the chapel service was dropped and sororities came into being. Edgar Hall came into use and Selby Stadium was built. Austin Manor and Perkins Observatory was constructed and Stuyvesant Hall was planned.

The 1930s were marked by the effects of the Great Depression years. Even before 1929 there had been a shrinkage of enrollment, alumni donations decreased, and faculty size remained the same resulting in the Soper (1928–1938) and Burgstahler's (1939–1947) administration battling mainly financial problems of survival. During the early 1930s the university administration undertook curriculum adjustments. Greek and Latin seemed to decline in popularity, business administration and economics continued to remain attractive, with the social sciences, English, pre-medicine and history among the largest enrollments at the school. The registrar in these years stated that these years saw a student "increase from eastern states and from Ohio cities, the number of foreign students and the fact that about seven hundred of our students contemplated some form of further educational work". By the 1930s, the number of Methodist students had appreciably declined to a minority among the student body.

== Today ==
The Conrades-Wetherell Science Center opened in 2004 to provide 52,000 square feet (4,800 m^{2}) of additional space for the science departments. An athletic fundraising campaign began in 2005.

Between 1996 and 2001 fiscal years, Ohio Wesleyan increased its expenditures per student by 23%, while the average increase over the same period for top tier liberal arts colleges was 17%. Economist Robert Lenke argued that this increase in spending per student contributed to an increase in the school's PhD creation rate, a rate that captures the number of students that obtained baccalaureates at Ohio Wesleyan and eventually earned a doctorate at another institution. During the same time period, the PhD creation rate for Ohio Wesleyan graduates increased from 3.8 to 5.3. Biological science and Social science graduates of the college receive doctorates at disproportionately higher rates than graduates in other academic fields.

Both academic and athletic achievements have marked Ohio Wesleyan's recent history. In mathematics, OWU's team has finished first five out of the last ten years at the Ohio Five mathematics contest. In the athletics world, the Battling Bishops have captured four NCAA Division III national championships in soccer and basketball in the last two decades.

Today, OWU maintains a loose, mainly historic, affiliation with the United Methodist Church.

== Timeline of recent developments ==
- 1991

- The Hamilton-Williams Campus Center opens.

- 1993

- Co-ops, called SLUs, are acquired by the university.

- 1994

- A major initiative for international students is endowed.
- Thomas Courtice is inaugurated as Ohio Wesleyan's 14th president.

- 1995

- The respective college presidents sign papers of incorporation on June 30, 1995, establishing The Five Colleges of Ohio, Inc. as a legal entity.
- Alumnus F. Sherwood Rowland shares the 1995 Nobel Prize in Chemistry for work in atmospheric chemistry.
- The student body expands by 20%.

- 1998

- The men's soccer team wins the NCAA Division III national championship.
- The Campaign for Wesleyan goes into its public phase with a goal of $100 million.

- 2001

- The women's soccer team wins the NCAA Division III national championship.

- 2003

- The Campaign for Wesleyan surpasses its $100-million goal by $10 million.
- The $33 million Science Center is built.

- 2004

- Mark Huddleston becomes Ohio Wesleyan's fifteenth president.
- The Strand Theatre in downtown Delaware is purchased by the university.
- The Richard M. Ross Art Museum opens.

- 2005

- A $22 million initiative is directed at addressing the needs of the university's athletic and recreation programs.

- 2008

- Rockwell F. Jones is inaugurated as Ohio Wesleyan's sixteenth president.

- 2010

- The $10 million Meek Aquatic Center is completed.

- 2011

- The Board of Trustees approves work to renovate Stuyvesant Hall. The 15-month project is expected to begin in summer 2011 and should be completed before the start of the 2012–2013 academic school year.
- The men's soccer team wins the NCAA Division III national championship.

- 2023
  - Beeghly Library is closed for the 2023–2024 academic year due to ongoing mold and water damage issues.
