= Five Colleges =

Five Colleges may refer to:

- Five College Consortium in Massachusetts
- Five Colleges of Ohio
- The Claremont Colleges in Claremont, California.
