= Schimmel =

Schimmel is a German and Dutch surname. Notable people with the surname include:

- Annemarie Schimmel (1922–2003), German Islam scholar
- Caroline Fearey Hover Scimmel (born 1944), librarian, scholar, creator of the University of Pennsylvania Kislak Library collection of Narratives of Women in the American Wilderness, featured in the documentary, The Booksellers, 2019
- Corrie Schimmel (born 1939), Dutch swimmer
- Hendrik Jan Schimmel (1823–1906), Dutch poet and novelist
- Henry S. Schimmel (1884–1975), American politician and judge
- Jason Schimmel (born 1978), American musician from the band Estradasphere
- Maximilian Schimmel (born 1989), German politician
- Michael Schimmel (1896–1981), CPA, Pace University; philanthropist, honorary trustee of Pace University
  - Michael Schimmel Center for the Arts, principal theatre of Pace University, New York City, named after Michael Schimmel (2024, destroyed by Pace); father-in-law of Caroline Fearey Hover Schimmel (born 1944)
- Paul Schimmel (born 1940), American biophysical chemist
- Paul Schimmel (curator) (born 1954), American curator of contemporary art
- Robert Schimmel (1950–2010), American stand-up comedian
- Samantha Schimmel (born 1995), American porn actress as Janice Griffith
- Sean Schimmel, American swimming coach
- Shoni Schimmel (born 1992), American basketball player
- Sven Schimmel (born 1989), German football defender
- Wilhelm Schimmel, German piano manufacturer founded by Wilhelm Schimmel (1854–1946)
- William Schimmel (born 1946), American accordionist

== See also ==
- Mold (German translation)
- Schimmel-Conrades Science Center
