= List of Ohio Wesleyan University buildings =

Coordinates: 40.2967°N 83.0667°W

This is a list of buildings owned by Ohio Wesleyan University in Delaware, Ohio.

== University Hall ==
University Hall is the home of many administrative offices, including the President's Office, Registrar's Office, and Business Affairs as well as the Modern Foreign Languages departments. It is one of the most notable landmark buildings on campus.

The original Gray Chapel is located in University Hall. It is the home of a $442,000 Johannes Klais Orgelbau Memorial Concert Organ with 82 ranks, 55 stops, and 4,522 pipes.

== Leon A. Beeghly Library ==
Ohio Wesleyan's main library is The Leon A. Beeghly Library housing a collection of more than 480,000 items, including rare books, manuscripts, art, microfilm, and federal government publications. Its Audio Visual Center includes a learning laboratory, multimedia classrooms, and individual viewing/listening rooms. The balance of the collection is in two other libraries elsewhere on campus (the science library in the Science Center and the music library in Sanborn Hall). The main Library also houses the Archives of Ohio United Methodism and is a national repository for government documents. In July 2023, it was announced that Beeghly library would be closed immediately due to environmental control issues. The current plan for the building is a complete tear down and rebuild of something completely new.

== Slocum Hall ==
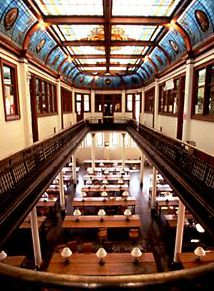
Slocum Hall

Slocum Hall was built in 1898 and features a Romanesque arcade and enormous glass skylight. It was the university library until 1966 when Beeghly Library was built. Several administrative offices are located in the Hall: the Admissions Office, Financial Aid, Minority Student Affairs, and Foreign Student Services. The Ancient, Medieval, and Renaissance Studies, Classics, Black World Studies, and Women's Studies departments are also located in Slocum Hall.

== Elliott Hall ==
Elliott Hall holds a significant place in Ohio Wesleyan's history. Delaware was laid out in 1808 and became a popular health resort. Established in 1842, the university was built around the town's Mansion House (now Elliott Hall). Elliott was built in 1833 in the Greek Revival style and is the original building on campus.

Currently, Elliott Hall houses OWU's international studies, politics and government, history, sociology and anthropology departments. The fourth floor houses the Book Review section of The Historian, which is the official journal of Phi Alpha Theta, the international history honor society, and is one of the largest circulating English-language history periodicals. The building is also on the National Register of Historic Places.

== Sturges Hall ==
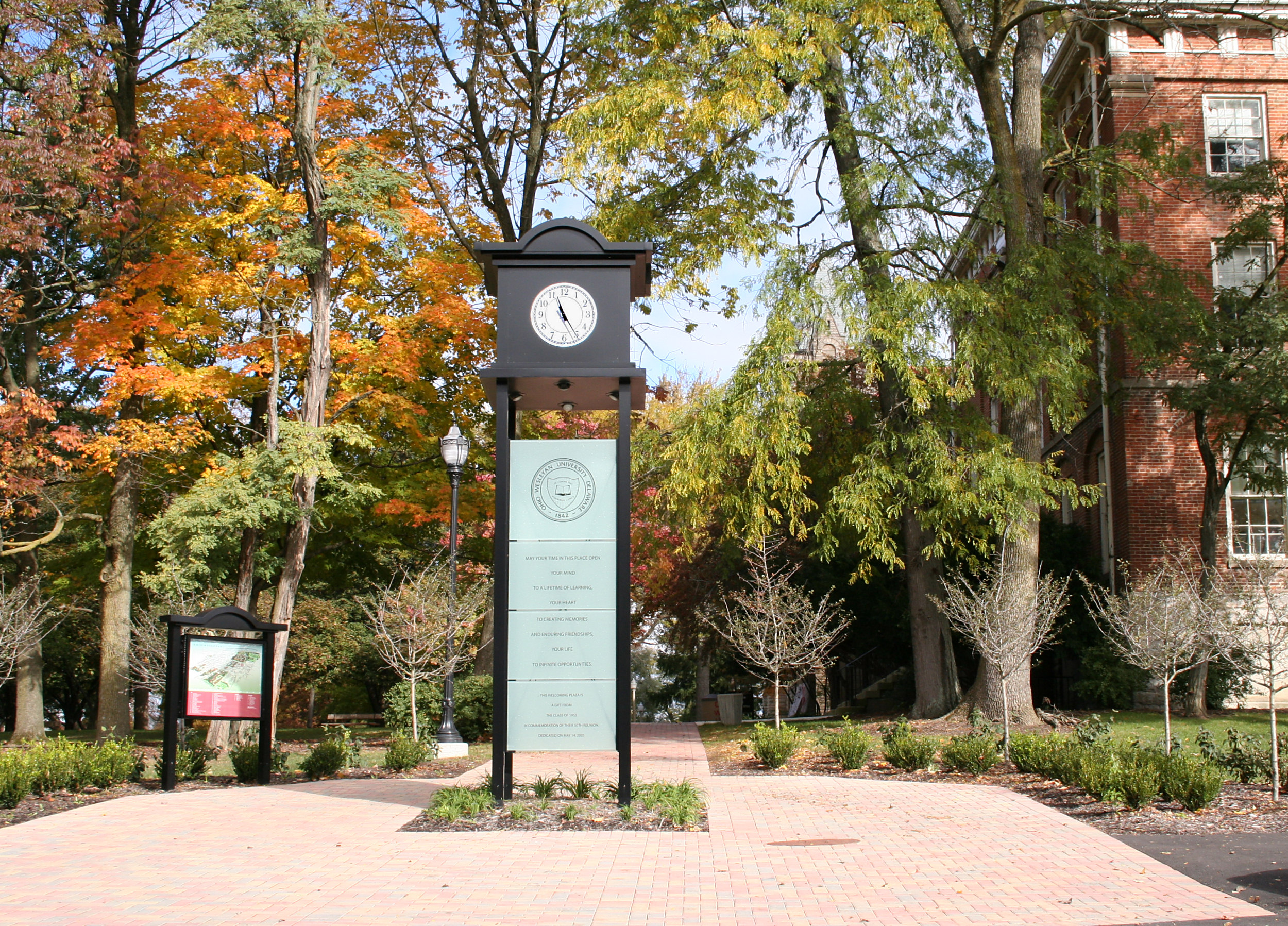
Campus clock in front of Sturges Hall

Sturges Hall was constructed in 1855. The red-brick structure is one of Wesleyan's first campus buildings. It served as a university library until Slocum Hall replaced it. Sturges Hall is currently the home for the English and Comparative Literature departments. The building also houses the University Honors Program. Sturges is on the National Register of Historic Places. The building is part of current University plans for creating a welcoming Plaza designed to connect several buildings.

== Edgar Hall ==
Edgar Hall is home of the Fine Arts Center. The building, a former underwear factory and textile mill, is located on North Sandusky Street. The building is also part of the National Register of Historic Places as it is part of the downtown Delaware historic district. In addition to the various studies, Edgar is a site for the University Werner Gallery. Apple Tree Arbor forms a park-like area stretching from Edgar Hall to the north-western edge of campus.

== Richard M. Ross Art Museum ==
The Richard M. Ross Art Museum was acquired in 1969 and is housed in a former post office. Over the years the museum's collection has been carefully developed through purchases and gifts. The collection consists of the Ohio Wesleyan University Permanent Collection as well as rotating exhibits. The collection is particularly strong in European art of the late 19th and early 20th centuries; contemporary American art; and Old Master and Japanese prints.

== Schimmel Conrades Science Center ==
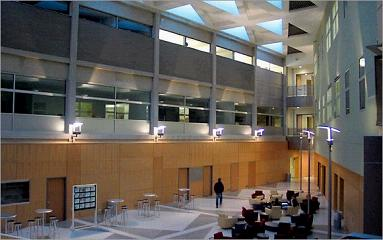
Science Center

The Schimmel Conrades Science Center is the home of the Botany-Microbiology, Zoology, Chemistry, Geology and Geography, Mathematics and Computer Science, and Physics and Astronomy departments. Originally, this was two separate buildings, Stewart Hall and Bigelow-Rice Hall. In 2004, a $35-million dollar project completely renovated Bigelow-Rice and added an extension to Stewart to create the new facility.

The center was known as the Conrades • Wetherell Science Center until September 2010, when the name 'Wetherell' was officially dropped, and removed from the lettering on the building. For less than a month thereafter, the building went by Conrades Science Center until Schimmel was added in October 2010.

== Phillips Hall ==
Phillips Hall is the home of the Psychology, Philosophy, Education, Experimental Psychology, Religion and East Asian Studies Departments. It was built in 1957. In addition to classrooms and offices, Phillips Hall also has approximately 8,000 square feet (740 m^{2}) of laboratories (700 m^{2}) designated for empirical research and clinical observation laboratories. The annual commencement ceremony has been held on the terrace of Phillips since 1958.

== Sanborn Hall ==
Sanborn Hall is home to the Music Department.

== Perkins Observatory ==
Ohio Wesleyan University owns the Perkins Observatory, which is located south of the city of Delaware. The observatory housed the 69-inch Perkins Telescope, which in 1931—the year of its completion—was the third-largest telescope in the world only after the 100-inch at Mount Wilson Observatory in California and the 72-inch at Victoria, B.C., Canada. The Perkins Telescope was moved to Arizona's Lowell Observatory in 1961 where it was used by Vera Rubin to study Dark Matter. The Perkins Telescope has since been replaced by The Schottland 32-inch Reflector. The grounds near Perkins also housed Ohio State's radio telescope, known locally as The Big Ear; the Big Ear was disassembled in 1998.

== Other buildings ==
Several of the campus buildings are listed on the National Register of Historic Places: Austin Manor, Edwards Gymnasium, Elliott Hall, Merrick Hall, Perkins Astronomical Observatory, Sanborn Hall, Slocum Hall, Sturges Hall, Stuyvesant Hall and The University Hall.
