= Herbert George Welch =

Herbert George Welch (November 7, 1862 – April 4, 1969) was an American bishop of the Methodist Episcopal Church, The Methodist Church and the United Methodist Church. He was elected to the episcopacy in 1916. He also distinguished himself as a Methodist pastor, and as the fifth President of Ohio Wesleyan University, Delaware, Ohio.

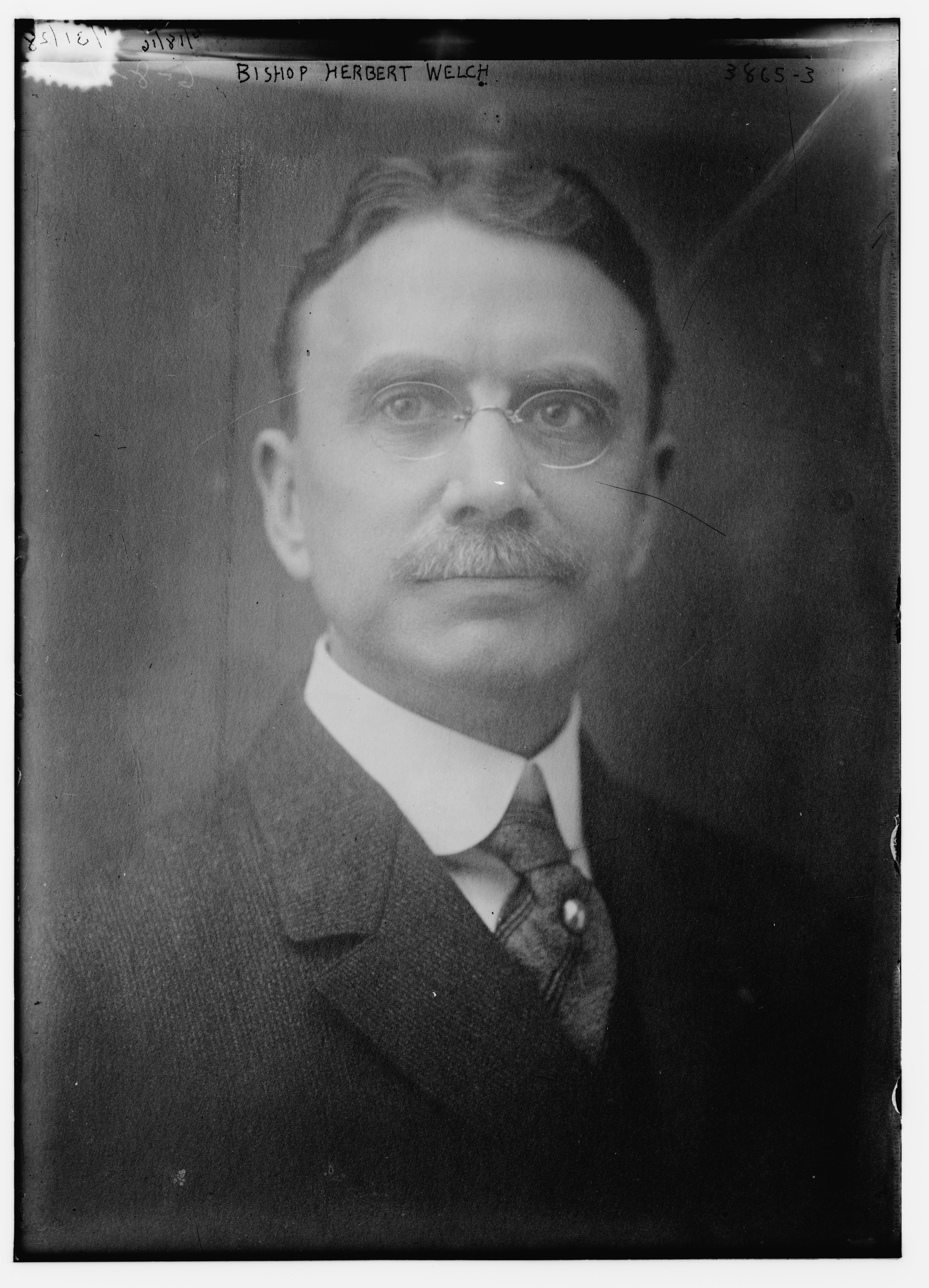
Bishop Herbert George Welch c. 1916

== Birth and family ==
Welch was born 7 November 1862 in New York City, New York. He was a son of Peter A. and Mary L. (née Loveland) Welch. Herbert married Adelaide Frances McGee 3 June 1890. They had two daughters: Dorothy McGee Welch and Eleanor Loveland Welch.

== Education ==
Welch attended the Brooklyn College and Polytechnic Institute (now NYU Poly) in 1882. He earned the B.A. degree from Wesleyan University in 1887. He earned an M.A. from Wesleyan in 1890. He attended Drew Theological Seminary, Madison, New Jersey, earning the B.D. degree in 1890. He did postgraduate work at Oxford University in 1903.

== Ordained and academic ministry ==
Welch entered the New York Annual Conference of the M.E. Church and was appointed to Bedford Station in 1890. In 1892 he was appointed pastor of St. Luke's M.E. Church in New York City. He then transferred to the New York East Annual Conference, where he was appointed successively to: Summerfield in Brooklyn, 1893–98; Middletown, Connecticut, 1898–1903; and the Chester Hill M.E. Church in Mt. Vernon, New York, 1903–05.

In 1905 Welch transferred his conference membership again, this time to the West Ohio Annual Conference, when he was named the president of Ohio Wesleyan University. He served as president until becoming bishop in 1916.

During 1907–1908, Welch was president of the Association of Ohio College Presidents and Deans. He was also the president of the Methodist Social Service from 1909 to 1912, and later served as chairman of the Methodist Commission for Overseas Relief, 1940–1948.

== Episcopal ministry ==
Welch was elected and consecrated a bishop by the M.E. General Conference of 1916. He served in this capacity for 53 years until his death at the age of 106 in 1969.

His first episcopal assignment was to Korea and Japan (the Seoul episcopal area), where he served for twelve years. From 1928 until 1932 he was assigned the Pittsburgh area. In 1932 he was sent to China for his last assignment. He retired in 1936 from the active episcopacy.

== See also ==
- List of bishops of the United Methodist Church
