= Strand Theatre (Delaware, Ohio) =

Coordinates: 40°18′00″N 83°04′00″W

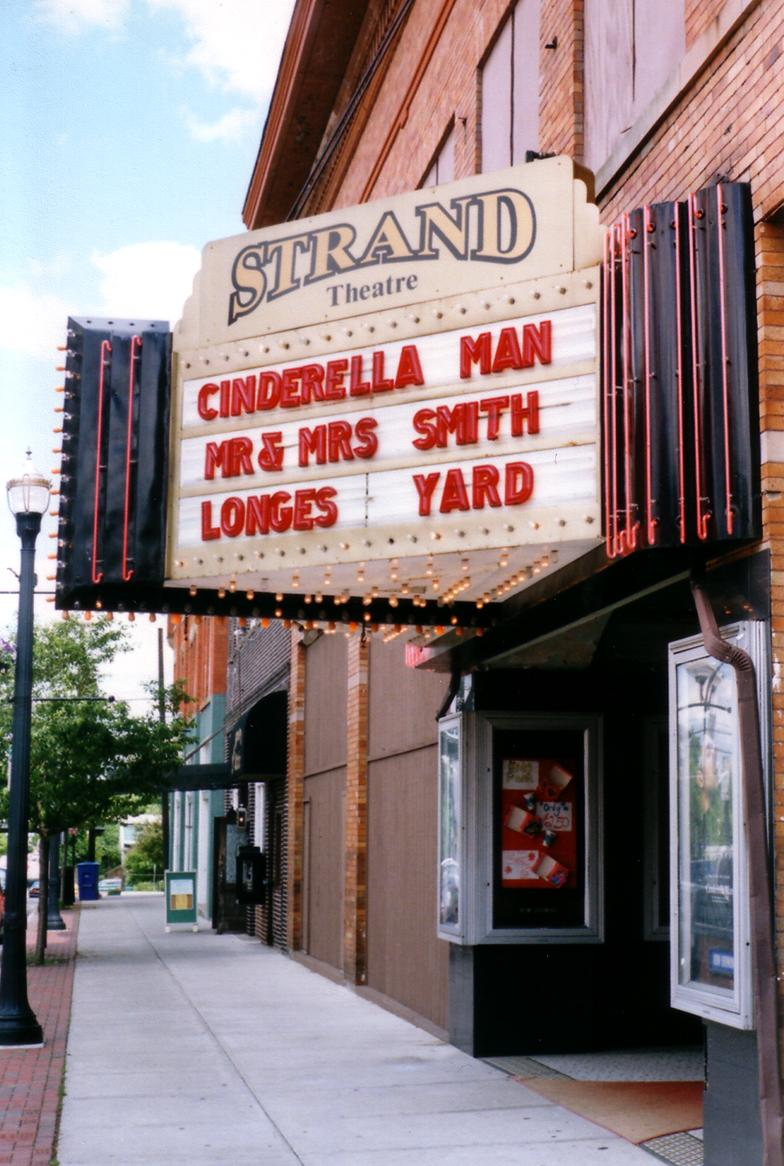
Entrance of the Strand Theatre

The Strand Theatre, is a movie theater located at 28 East Winter Street in downtown Delaware, Ohio, near the campus of Ohio Wesleyan University. Opened on April 10, 1916, The Strand is the tenth longest operating movie theater in the United States.

== History ==
The theatre opened on April 10, 1916. It was first owned by Henry Bieberson. The building was originally the New York Cash Store, a department store built in 1908. Near the exit of the theatre, one can see the original opening announcement from The Journal Herald, printed on April 8, 1916. The original theatre sat 800 people, with large main floor and a second floor balcony. Opening night they showed Pennington's Choice, an American silent drama film. Strand has never been closed since its opening.

Schine Theatres was a chain of theatres run out of Gloversville, NY. The chain had operated 170 movie theatres in 6 different states during their operation. In 1965, the Summer Kids Series kicked off for the first time. This became a long running tradition at the theatre. Evolving from a ticketed series in the mid-century to a donation-based local charity event in more recent history.

In 1971 a previous Schine manager and his wife, George and Cindy Johnson, bought the single screen theatre. They presided over a renovation which included adding two more screens; in 1982 the second screen was added in the adjoining storefront, and in 1986 the original balcony was walled off and turned into its own screen. George and Cindy eventually retired back to Greece, selling The Strand to Jerry and Cathy Amato on February 11, 1994.

The Amatos operated the theatre until Ohio Wesleyan University took ownership in 2002. The Amatos kept the theatre running during a rough time in its history. This was an effort to preserve its place in the community of Delaware city and in history. When OWU took ownership, they helped create the Strand Theatre and Cultural Arts Association, a 501 (c) 3 Non-profit board that currently owns the Strand.

On February 12, 2009 the Strand Theater & Cultural Arts Association received an award for the renovations made to the concessions area, and the restoration of the second floor windows. The Strand's manager at the time, Kara (McVay) Long, also received an award recognizing her efforts to promote the community and causes.

In 2010, the Strand announced plans for $5 million in renovations. The renovations planned to add digital projectors (which did occur), add three more screens, a blade with the Strand's name on the marquee, and a back entrance within the next three years. The Strand requested $50,000 in economic development funds each from Delaware County and the City of Delaware for new seats and wall coverings. On October 4, 2010, Delaware County commissioners granted $175,000 for renovations to the Strand.

The theatre continued showing movies on 35mm film until 2012. The final movie shown on motion picture film at the Strand was The Dark Knight Rises. The conversion to digital was expensive but the undertaking was completed in early August 2012. All movies have been digital since.

In 2016, The Strand commemorated 100 years of continuous operation with its Century of Cinema celebration. A strip of stars in the sidewalk outside as well as a plaque inside indicate the donors that made renovations possible. A short documentary on the history of the theatre was also created at this time.

Presently, The Strand is still running partially as a non-profit. In 2024, Strand Cinema LTD was formed as a for-profit subsidiary, so the operations of showing first run movies were separate from the tax-exempt charitable and education focused activities of the Strand Theatre and Cultural Art Association. They partner with local businesses and community members to sustain the theatre as an icon of the city of Delaware. They consistently show first-run films as well as host community events.
