= Archives of Ohio United Methodism =

The Archives of Ohio United Methodism, (AOUM) a collective history of The United Methodist Church in Ohio, are held at Methodist Theological School in Ohio in Delaware, Ohio. The current collection comprises documents from the two conferences of The United Methodist Church in Ohio; the West Ohio Conference and the East Ohio Conference. The collections of the two conferences were unified to form the Archives of Ohio United Methodism in 2003.

The first archive for documents pertaining to the church in Ohio, then known as the Methodist Episcopal Church, was established at Cincinnati, Ohio in 1839, the purpose of which was to "collect and preserve. . .materials for a complete and authentic history of the Methodist Episcopal Church west of the Allegheny Mountains. . ." This collection was later moved to Ohio Wesleyan in 1851.

Included in the collection are original, primary, documents dating from the establishment of the Methodist Episcopal Church in Ohio, and all of its antecedent denominations through and including the emergence of The United Methodist Church in 1968.

== Sources ==
- Archives of Ohio United Methodism, Ohio Wesleyan University, Delaware, Ohio.
