= The Transcript =

Student newspaper at Ohio Wesleyan University

The Transcript, published at Ohio Wesleyan University, is the oldest independent college student newspaper in the United States.

The newspaper dates back to 1867 when it first appeared under the name Western Collegian. Joseph B. Battelle was the first editor of Western Collegian, at that time a student at Ohio Wesleyan University. Following his graduation from Wesleyan, Battelle would become one of the most prominent journalists at Toledo Blade.

Charles W. Fairbanks served as a co-editor of the Western Collegian. After graduation, Fairbanks went on to become a U.S. Senator and Vice-President of the U.S. under Theodore Roosevelt.
