= Charles Payne (clergyman) =

American clergyman, writer, and university president

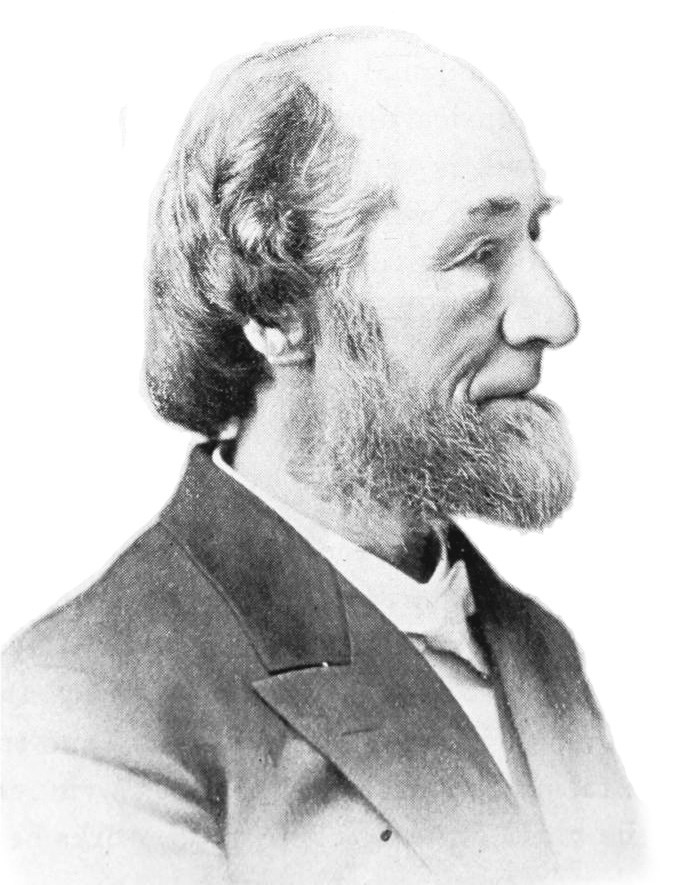

Charles Henry Payne (1830–1899), a clergyman, revised the hymn-book of the Methodist denomination in the late 19th century. He was president of Ohio Wesleyan University and an author.

== Biography ==
Charles Payne was born in Taunton, Massachusetts, on October 24, 1830. He received an A.B. from Wesleyan University in Middletown, Connecticut, in 1856, and an A.M. from the same university in 1859. Payne studied at the Biblical Institute in Concord, New Hampshire, and joined the Providence Conference of the Methodist Episcopal Church in 1857. Subsequently, he erected St. John's church in Brooklyn, New York, at a cost of $200,000 and the Arch Street church in Philadelphia, Pennsylvania, at a cost of $260,000. He was president of Ohio Wesleyan University in Delaware, Ohio, from 1876 to 1888.

Payne was an organizer, member, and principal contributor of the committee to revise the hymn-book of his denomination in 1876, a delegate to the General Methodist Conferences of 1880, 1884, 1888, 1892 and 1896, and a delegate to the Ecumenical conference in London in 1881. He traveled extensively in Egypt, Europe, Greece, the Holy Land, and Syria.

He received the honorary degrees D.D. from Dickinson College in 1870 and LL.D. from Ohio State University in 1875. Payne is the author of, among other works:

- The Social Glass, and Christian Obligation (1868)
- Daniel, the Uncompromising Young Man (1872)
- Young People's Half-Hour Series (1872)
- Methodism, its History and Results (1881)
- Women, and their Work in Methodism (1881)
- Temperance (1881)
- Education (1881)
- Guides in Character Building (1883)

He died at Clifton Springs, New York, on May 5, 1899.
