= Thomas Courtice =

American university president (born 1943)

Thomas Barr Courtice (born October 31, 1943) was the president of Ohio Wesleyan University between 1994 and 2004. He received degrees from the University of Pittsburgh, Indiana University, and the University of Minnesota. Prior to becoming president of Ohio Wesleyan, he served for eight years as president of West Virginia Wesleyan College.

Courtice has also served as president of the North Coast Athletic Conference.

Formerly president of Academic Search located in Washington, D.C., he was also a search consultant for AGB Search in Washington, DC. Additionally, Dr. Courtice was employed at Hamline University (St. Paul, MN) as Director of Placement from 1967-69; Assistant to the President from 1969-74 and then finally, Vice President of University Affairs.
