= Edward Thomson (bishop) =

American bishop (1810–1870)

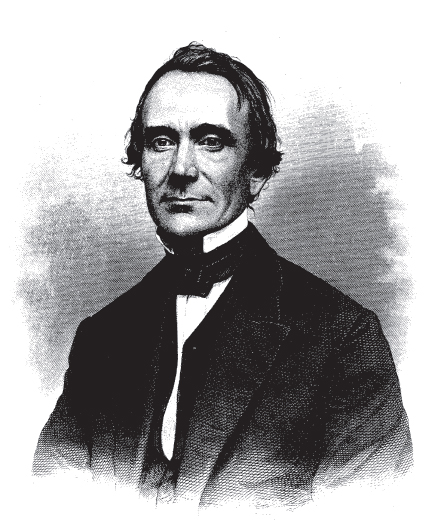
- Born: October 12, 1810; Portsea, Portsmouth, England
- Died: March 21, 1870 (aged 59); Wheeling, West Virginia, U.S.
- Title: Bishop of the Methodist Episcopal Church

Edward Thomson (October 12, 1810 – March 21, 1870) was an American Bishop of the Methodist Episcopal Church (and therefore also of the United Methodist Church), elected in 1864.

== Early life ==
Thomson was born in Portsea, part of Portsmouth, England. When he was seven years old his family emigrated to the United States, settling in Wooster, Ohio.

His father, a pharmacist, influenced Edward toward the study of medicine, which he pursued at the University of Pennsylvania. He united with the M.E. Church April 29, 1832, and was licensed as an exhorter the next year. Indiana Asbury (now DePauw) University gave him the degree of D.D. in 1846, and Ohio Wesleyan that of LL.D. in 1855.

== Ordained ministry ==
The following July, Thomson was recommended for admission to the Ohio Annual Conference, and he was received "on trial" that September. He was appointed junior preacher on the Norwalk Circuit. His great abilities were apparent almost immediately. In 1836, he was appointed to Detroit in the Michigan Annual Conference (the northern part of Ohio then being a part of the Michigan Conference). Lewis Cass, Governor of Michigan, though a Presbyterian, was among Rev. Thomson's parishioners. While at Detroit, Thomson married a daughter of Mordecai Bartley, a U.S. congressman and later also a governor.

In 1837, Thomson became the principal of the Norwalk Seminary, where his success was so great that in 1843 he was offered the chancellorship of the University of Michigan and the presidency of Transylvania College. In 1844 Edward was elected by the M.E. General Conference as the editor of the Ladies' Repository, an important denominational periodical. He was re-elected to this post in 1848, but instead was called to the presidency of Ohio Wesleyan University, a post he held until 1860. He was elected editor of the Christian Advocate in 1860, remaining until 1864 despite much opposition.

== Episcopal ministry ==
Elected to the episcopacy in 1864, Bishop Thomson continued in this office until his death. He likewise attained high rank as a lecturer and an editor, writing much for periodicals and papers. He was a profound student, though absent-minded, preferring the seclusion of a college to the episcopal "office." Notwithstanding, he was among the most eminent of bishops of that time.

Thomson died in Wheeling, West Virginia. He was buried at Oak Grove Cemetery in Delaware, Ohio.

== Selected writings ==
- Educational Essays (new edition), Cincinnati, 1856.
- Moral and Religious Essays, 1856.
- Biographical and Incidental Sketches, 1856.
- Letters from Europe, 1856.
- Letters from India, China, and Turkey, (2 vols.), 1870.
- Our Oriental Missions, 1870.

== See also ==
- List of bishops of the United Methodist Church
