= Ohio Wesleyan University =

Private university in Delaware, Ohio, US

Coordinates: 40.2967°N 83.0667°W

- Motto: In lumine tuo videbimus lumen (Latin)
- Motto in English: In Your Light We Shall See the Light
- Type: Private liberal arts college
- Established: September 1842; 183 years ago
- Religious affiliation: United Methodist Church
- Academic affiliations: Annapolis Group; GLCA; Ohio Five; IAMSCU; NAICU
- Endowment: $325.3 million (2025)
- President: Matthew vandenBerg
- Administrative staff: 200
- Undergraduates: 1,600
- Location: Delaware, Ohio, U.S.
- Campus: Suburban, 200 acres (81 ha)
- Colors: Red; Black
- Nickname: Battling Bishops
- Sporting affiliations: NCAA Division III – NCAC
- Mascot: The Battling Bishop
- Website: owu.edu
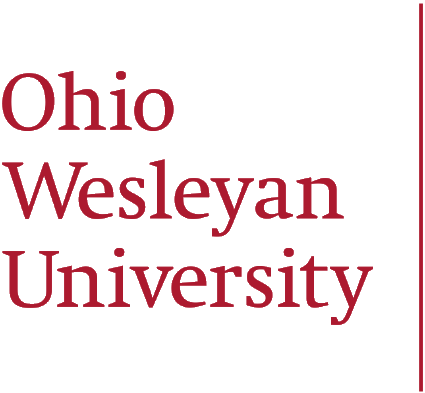

Ohio Wesleyan University (abbreviated OWU) is a private liberal arts college in Delaware, Ohio, United States. Founded in 1842 by Methodist leaders and central Ohio residents, OWU is a member of the Ohio Five – a consortium of Ohio liberal arts colleges. Its 200-acre (81 ha) campus is 27 miles (44 km) north of Columbus, Ohio, and includes the main academic and residential campus, Perkins Observatory, and the Kraus Wilderness Preserve.

== History ==
=== Founding (1841–1855) ===
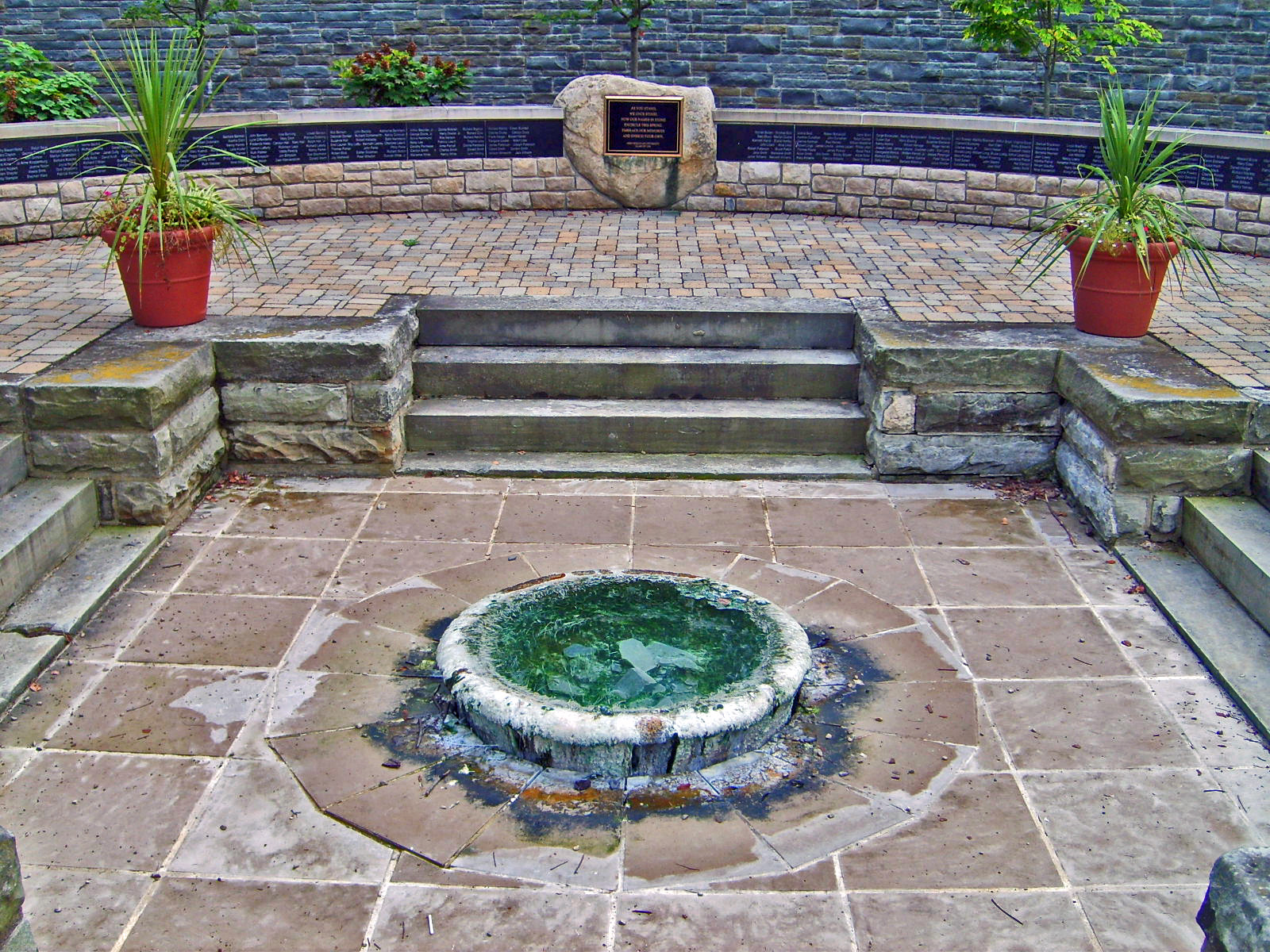
The Sulphur Spring, renovated in 2005, was a major vacation spot for health seekers in the 1830s.

In 1841, Ohio residents Adam Poe and Charles Elliott decided to establish a university "of the highest order" in central Ohio. To that end, they purchased the Mansion House Hotel, a former health resort featuring the Sulphur Spring, using funds raised from local residents. Poe and Elliott wrote a charter emphasizing "the democratic spirit of teaching", which was approved by the Ohio State Legislature. Early in the following year they opened the college preparatory academy and formed a board of trustees. Ohio Wesleyan University, named (like several other U.S. colleges and universities) after John Wesley, founder of Methodism, opened on November 13, 1844, as a Methodist-related but nonsectarian institution, with a College of Liberal Arts for male students.

Ohio Wesleyan's first president, Edward Thomson, stated in his inaugural address on August 5, 1846, that the school was "a product of the liberality of the local people." This liberal philosophy contributed to Ohio Wesleyan's vocal opposition to slavery in the 1850s. In the annual celebration for George Washington's birthday in 1862, second president Frederick Merrick endorsed Ohio Wesleyan's "ideals of democracy" during his oration.

=== Early growth (1855–1930) ===
During the mid-19th century, Ohio Wesleyan focused on attracting students, adding fields of study, and fundraising, by which it significantly increased its endowment. Sturges Hall was constructed as the university's first library in 1855. In 1873, the school added the Department of Natural History housed in Merrick Hall. The Ohio Wesleyan Female College, established in 1853, merged with the university in 1877. Between 1876 and 1888, enrollment tripled and music education greatly increased, yet no major buildings were built in this time.

By the end of the 19th century, Ohio Wesleyan had added a School of Music (1877), School of Fine Arts (1877), School of Oratory (1894), and Business School (1895) to the original College of Liberal Arts (founded in 1844). To address the need for new departments and specialized instruction, the administration improved the facilities and courses to make them on par with OWU's new academic position. University Hall, Slocum Library, extensions to the Monnett campus, and athletic facilities were all constructed during that period.

Between 1891 and 1895, Ohio Wesleyan specialized the curriculum by establishing departments for physics, zoology, geology, speech, history, French, English, and economics. This specialization encouraged undergraduates to continue studies at graduate level, allowed professional preparation for the Doctor of Philosophy degree, and promoted exchange study in Europe. Two professional schools for law and medicine were formed in 1896, with support from the Wesleyan Methodist Church.

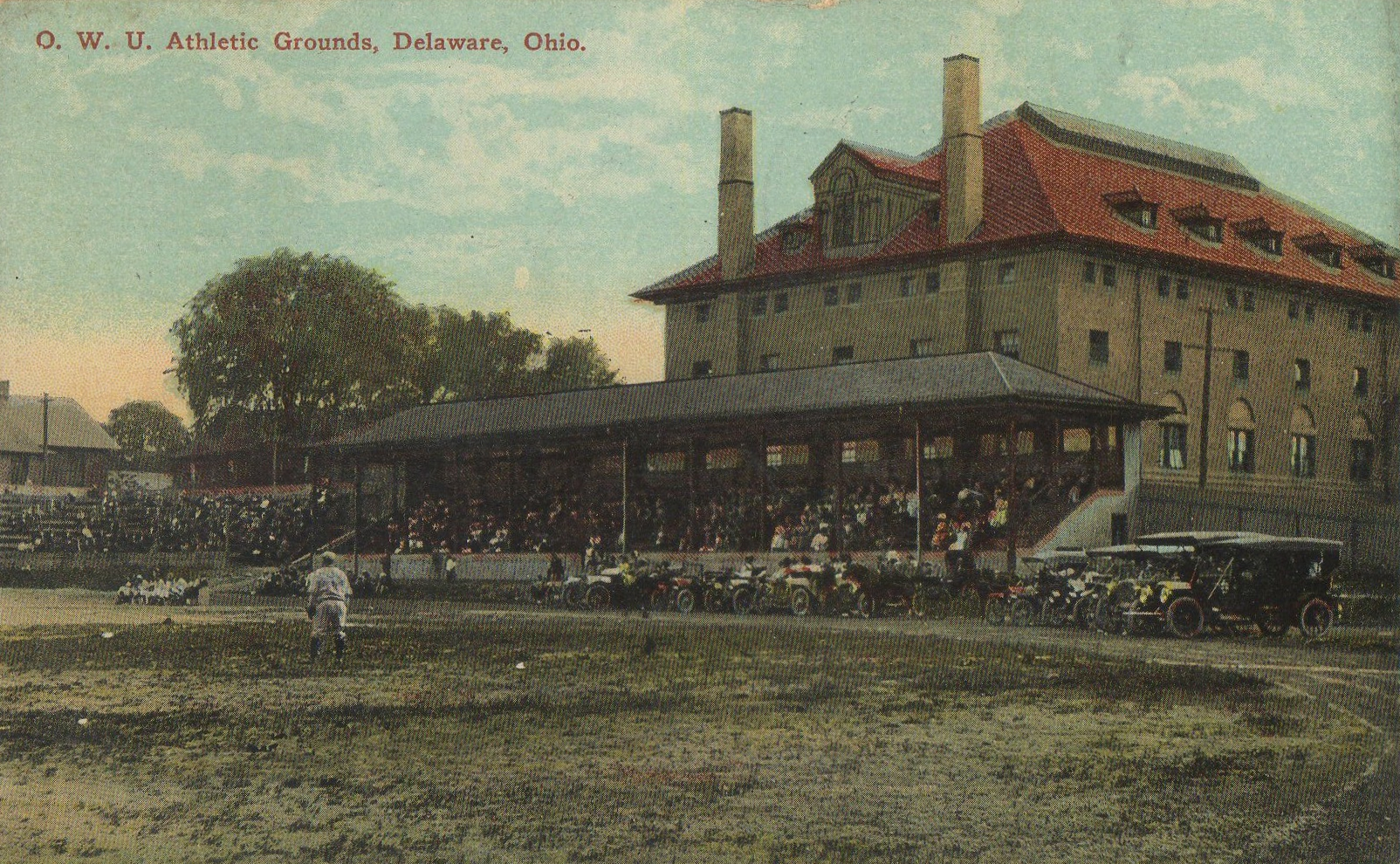
Depiction of a baseball game at Edwards Field in 1915, with Edwards Gymnasium in the background.

In 1905, the board of trustees decided to keep Ohio Wesleyan a college, despite the expansion of the curriculum and campus and the word "university" in the institution's name. The Bachelor of Science degree was abolished, which left only the Bachelor of Arts. Two students were selected as Rhodes Scholars in 1905 and 1909. Edwards Gymnasium was built in 1906. In 1907, the United Societies of Phi Beta Kappa, the oldest undergraduate honor society in the United States, installed the "Eta of Ohio" ΦΒΚ chapter on campus. In 1909, the school added Sanborn Hall, housing the Music Department.

In the 1920s, academic requirements for the bachelor's degree were reduced, and Latin and mathematics were no longer emphasized. During the presidency of John W. Hoffman (1916–1928), the academy and School of Business were closed; the academy had started in 1842 as a preparatory school, and throughout its seventy-five years frequently outnumbered the college in enrollment. Also in the 1920s, the chapel service was dropped and sororities were formed. Ohio Wesleyan also increased the number of buildings on campus, including Selby Stadium, Austin Manor, and Perkins Observatory; another building, Stuyvesant Hall, was in planning; and Edgar Hall was opened.

=== Curriculum changes (1930–1984) ===
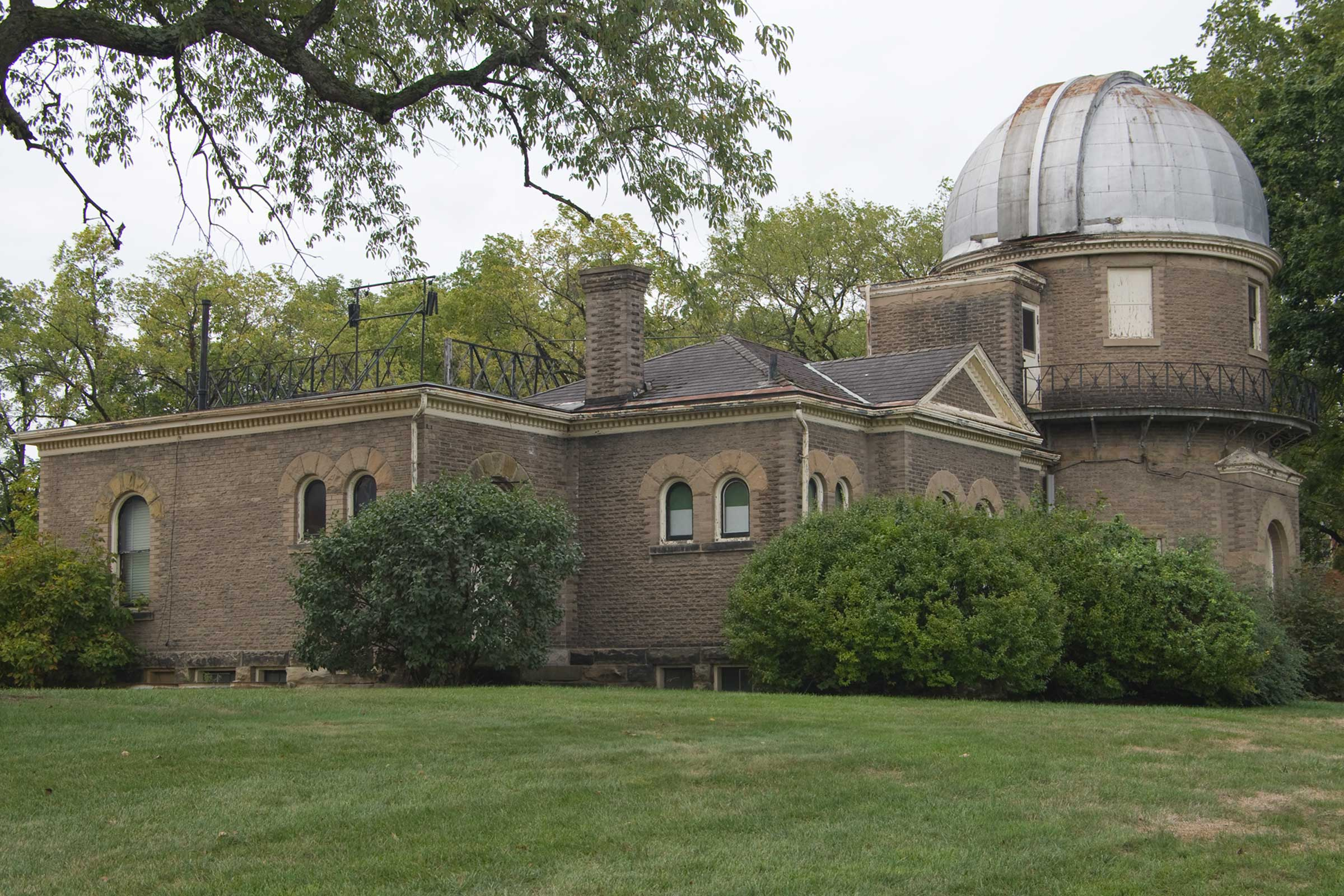
The Ohio Wesleyan University Student Observatory, part of the Perkins Observatory.

During the Great Depression, both enrollment and alumni donations shrank. While the faculty size remained stable, lack of tuition and alumni revenues precipitated financial problems which threatened the college's survival in the administrations of Edmund D. Soper (1928–1938), Acting President Edward Loranus Rice (1938–1939), and Herbert John Burgstahler (1939–1949).

The administration adjusted the curriculum during the early 1930s to address these problems. Greek and Latin declined, while business administration and economics thrived and the highest enrollments were in the social sciences, English, pre-medicine, and history. The registrar reported that, in these years, the number of students from New England states, urban Ohio areas, and from international locations increased. By the 1930s, the Methodist students were a minority among the student body; formal ties to the Methodist church were severed in the 1920s and led to debate among board members in the 1930s, eventually resulting in the university's current active but loose historical affiliation with the United Methodist Church. In a study into the relationship between American educational institutions and the Christian denominations they were historically affiliated with, James Tunstead Burtuchell writes that it was during this period that "in its personnel, its resources, and its students", Ohio Wesleyan lost its "symbiotic intimacy with the United Methodist Church."

In 1946, Ohio Wesleyan introduced a new "Centennial Curriculum", which enacted seven distribution requirements across the sciences and humanities; the new requirement for a foreign language course was added to the existing humanities requirement. Thomson and Bashford Halls, originally men's dorms, were built between 1951 and 1954. In the 1960s, faculty, staff and administrators fought over administrative structure and control. They eventually settled on a new "statement of aims" that stressed values, rather than religious goal statements, and instituted a more internationalized curriculum, a new Women's Studies Program, and an International Business major; the faculty senate also introduced a new academic calendar with three 10.5-week terms.

Thomas Wenzlau's presidency (1968–1984) began with the challenge of campus unrest: Ohio Wesleyan students took over the ROTC building, demanded its shut-down, and eventually eliminated ROTC in 1970. Students also demanded participation in departmental meetings and faculty committees, and the democratic process in the governance of Ohio Wesleyan grew in this period. Wenzlau's presidency witnessed decline in students' test scores, an unusually high attrition rate, lack of adequate research to identify potential major donors and a growing "party school" image, leading to a rocky relationship between him and the student body. Between 1979 and 1982, the campus newspaper The Transcript frequently criticized Wenzlau's presidency, blaming it for "severely affecting the reputation of the college". This exchange resulted in a Washington Post report on the school that eventually precipitated the end of Wenzlau's presidency.

=== Contemporary period (1984–present) ===
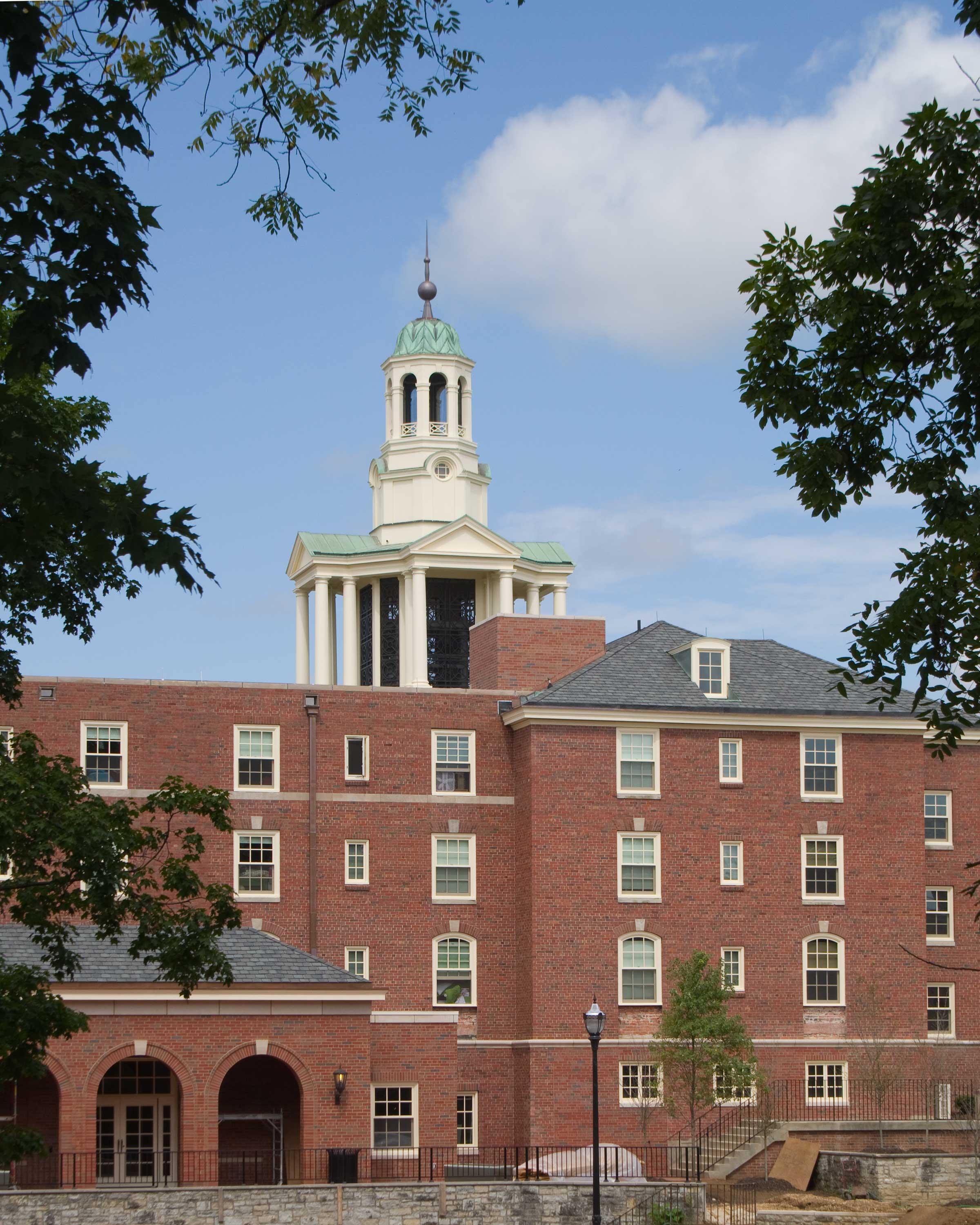
Stuyvesant Hall, built in 1930, is the oldest residence in use on West Campus.

The president, David Warren, increased admission standards in 1985, engaged students in a "live-in" presidency, expanded media exposure and established a National Colloquium focused on the liberal arts. Warren engaged in forty-one interviews on the ABC and NBC networks.

More recently, Ohio Wesleyan has achieved several academic and athletic recognitions. A 1986 study, titled "Educating America's Scientists: The Role of the Research Colleges," identified Ohio Wesleyan as one of 48 highly selective "science-active" liberal arts institutions in the nation. The Battling Bishops won NCAA Division III national championships in men's basketball (1988) and men's (1998, 2011) and women's (2001, 2002) soccer. Ohio Wesleyan also is reporting increasing enrollment figures, In fall 2025, Ohio Wesleyan reported its fourth consecutive year of enrollment growth, with1,652 undergraduates, up about 8% since fall 2024. The university also enrolled 516 new, first-time students, up from 474 in fall 2024.

Ohio Wesleyan continues to undertake construction projects. The Hamilton-Williams Campus Center opened in 1991. The Memorial Union Building was renovated in 2001 to accommodate the Economics Department, the Academic Resource Center, the Information Services portion of the combined Libraries and Information Services department, and the Woltemade Center for Economics, Business and Entrepreneurship. The Schimmel/Conrades Science Center opened in 2004 to provide 52,000 square feet (4,800 m^{2}) of additional space for the science departments. In 2011, the Meek Aquatics Center opened as a state-of-the-art facility, also used by the Delaware community. In 2018, the university opened the Delaware Entrepreneurial Center at OWU in collaboration with the City of Delaware and Delaware County. In 2019, Ohio Wesleyan announced an ambitious Residential Renewal project, committing $60M to renovating existing buildings and the construction of a new village of apartments.

== Campus ==
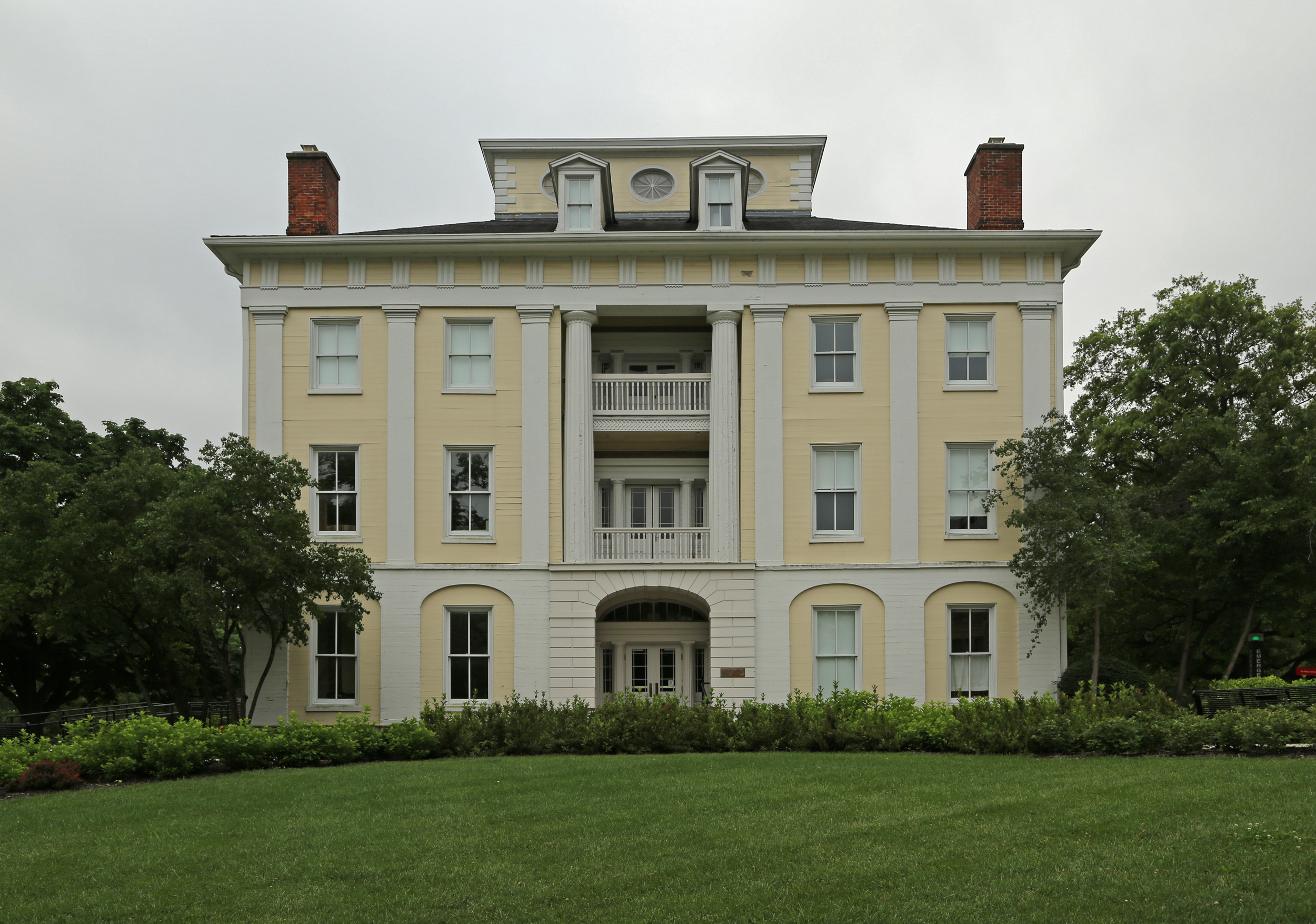
Elliott Hall, the first college building on campus, was renovated in 2014 and is Ohio's oldest collegiate Greek Revival building.

The Ohio Wesleyan campus is next to downtown Delaware, and is bisected by Sandusky Street, the main north–south street through the heart of the city. The street informally divides the campus into an eastern sector composed mainly of academic buildings and a western sector composed mainly of residential and administrative buildings. Many facilities have been constructed in the last two years, with substantial benefit to science, art, and athletic programs on campus.

=== Other facilities and off-campus programs ===
OWU operates several facilities outside campus: The Philadelphia Business Center, Wesleyan in Washington, The New York Arts Program for the performing, visual, and media arts (a GLCA arts program), Perkins Observatory, The Strand Theatre, and the Kraus Wilderness Preserve.

Perkins Observatory is situated in Delaware on land separate to the main campus. The observatory is named after Hiram Perkins, a former professor of mathematics and astronomy at the college. When the observatory was built in 1931, it housed the third-largest telescope in the world, which has since been moved to Arizona. The Perkins dome now houses a 32-inch (810 mm) telescope, which is the second-largest in Ohio.

The university also maintains offices for study abroad, US domestic study, and internship programs. Such programs include: Wesleyan in Washington, which allows students to study for a semester in Washington, D.C., in research and internship positions. The Philadelphia Center offers students hundreds of internship and field placement opportunities off-campus and the chance to live independently. and the New York Arts Program, which allows students of the arts to gain a semester of hands on experience in the arts in New York City.

=== Community relations ===
OWU has strong community ties with the City of Delaware. Students participate in Delaware's community through a variety of educational, social, and cultural programs. The student-led Columbus Initiative, founded in 1989, is an experiential learning partnership between OWU and Columbus public schools. More than 150 Ohio Wesleyan students from this program tutor and mentor underprivileged pupils from Columbus.

The Ohio Wesleyan Ambassadors Program (ISAP) promotes cultural diversity and ethnic awareness within the local community, and exposes international students to American culture through the community. The program's ambassadors visit local schools to give presentations and participate in events for local non-profit community organizations.

Campus organizations cooperate with local residents on issues of civic engagement and activism. Progress OWU allows students from Ohio Wesleyan and local schools to express their voices on politics, public policy, and corporate and social issues, both on campus and in the local community.

Cultural programs also take part in community relations. In the 1960s, Ohio Wesleyan donated the Arts Castle, then part of the Fine Arts department, to the City of Delaware. It is now home to the Delaware County Cultural Arts Center. The Arts Castle hosts a variety of community programs in art, and offers classes ranging from ballet to fine arts. In 2004, the OWU received a donation to rehabilitate the historic Strand Theatre in downtown Delaware.

The university and the City of Delaware sponsor several events in town throughout the year: the Delaware Arts Festival, the Little Brown Jug, the Delaware County Fair, and the Castle Arts Affair. The Delaware Arts Festival is an annual event held the weekend after Mother's Day on the streets of Historic Downtown Delaware. The festival hosts over 170 booths featuring works of local, regional, and other artists. OWU professors chair the committees that select winners. The Little Brown Jug, a harness race, is run during the Delaware County Fair in September. The OWU president and the college mascot traditionally award the trophy for the first division of the first heat of the race.

== Academics ==
Academic rankings

Liberal arts
- U.S. News & World Report: 119 of 211
- Washington Monthly: 158 of 199

National
- WSJ/College Pulse: 204 (tie) of 600

Undergraduate admissions statistics
- 2024 entering class
- Admit rate: 55.60%
- Yield rate: 12.65%

High school GPA^{[ii]}
- Top 10%: 27.00%
- Top 25%: 58.00%
- Top 50%: 89.00%

Ohio Wesleyan University is accredited by The Higher Learning Commission, and is a member of the Great Lakes Colleges Association, the Oberlin Group, and the Five Colleges of Ohio, a consortium of Ohio liberal arts colleges which also includes Kenyon College, Oberlin College, The College of Wooster, and Denison University. For first-year admission in 2024, the university received 6,144 applications, accepted 3,416 applicants, and enrolled 432 students. The university does not require standardized tests for admission.

=== Curriculum ===
Freshmen are paired early in their first year with academic advisors who oversee their students' academic progress. Upon completing 34 units of coursework, students may earn diplomas in Bachelor of Science, Bachelor of Arts, or Bachelor of Fine Arts. Ohio Wesleyan has research departments and teaching faculties in most academic disciplines; as of 2025, OWU offered majors and minors in more than 80 fields.

In its early days, OWU's curriculum began with classical studies, for the course catalogue maintained that "the classical course in Greek and Latin and pure mathematics bring correctness in mental processes that an applied art, or a living and slightly inflected language, do not permit." Scientific courses were added to Ohio Wesleyan's curriculum in 1849, and since then, scientific subjects have become a foundation to the liberal arts curriculum. OWU also has a highly respected music department.

Its most popular majors, based on 2021 graduates, were:

- Zoology/Animal Biology (23)
- Psychology (21)
- Sports, Kinesiology, & Physical Education/Fitness (16)
- Business Administration & Management (15)
- History (15)
- Political Science & Government (12)

=== Internationalism ===
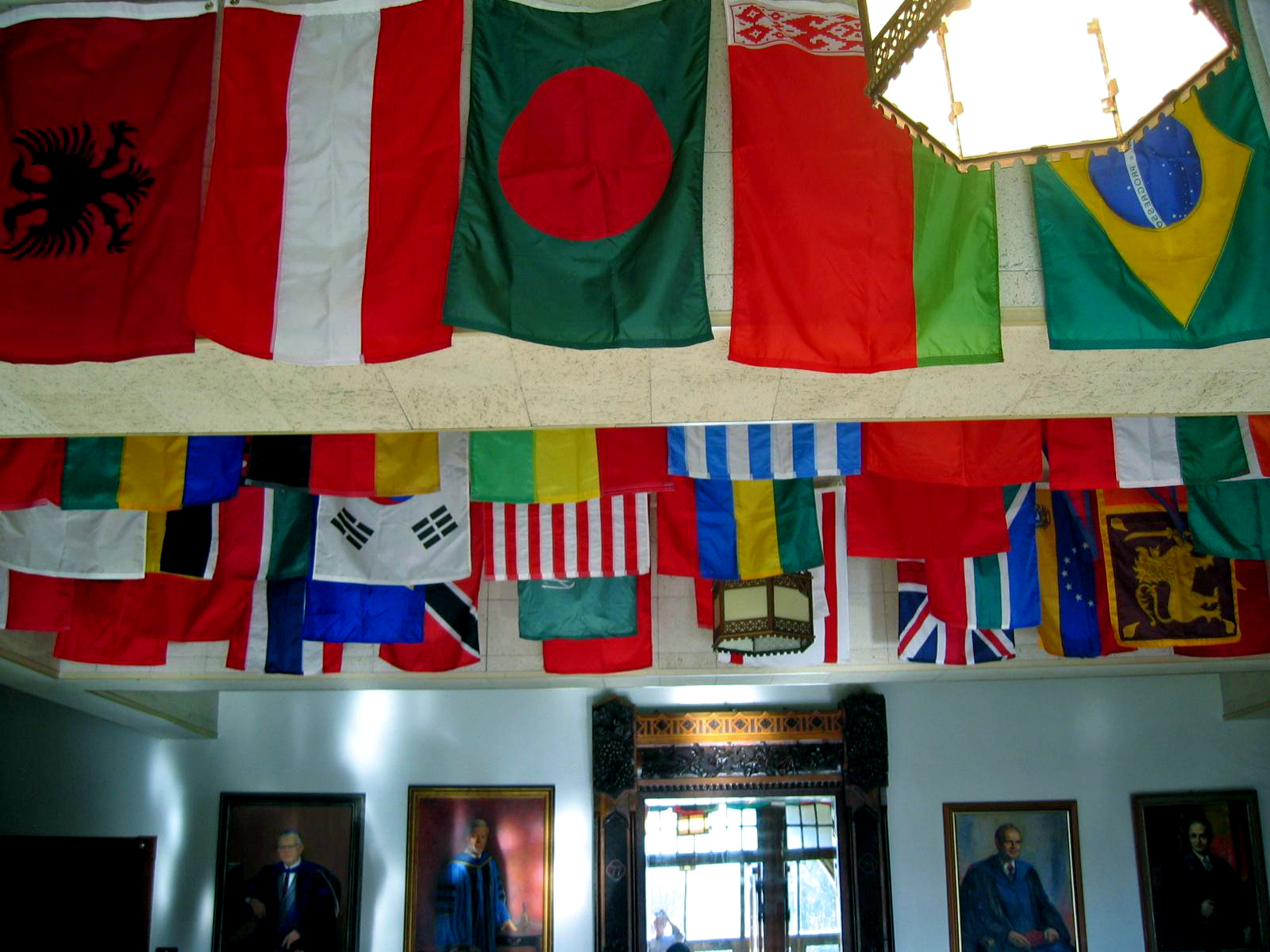
Flags in University Hall of students' countries represented at Ohio Wesleyan University.

Ohio Wesleyan has upheld academic internationalism since its early years; since the 19th century, the college has established links with several international schools. In 1879, OWU alumna Elizabeth Russell founded Kwassui Women's College in Nagasaki, Japan, when predominant Japanese culture considered women's education unimportant. Today, Kwassui College is one of the top finishing schools for young women in Japan. In 1899, William Ehnis (from the class of 1898) traveled to Africa and opened a school in Mutare, Zimbabwe, that eventually became the Africa University. Ada M. Coe was an early woman Spanish Professor here in 1917.

Since 1983, Ohio Wesleyan has been listed in U.S. News & World Report among colleges that attract the highest percentage of international students. The percentage of international students grew in the early and mid-1990s. In a study adjusted for school size, Ohio Wesleyan came ninth among 118 American colleges and universities in total aid awards to international students and 69th in average award per international student among both large universities and small liberal arts colleges. South East Asian students have significantly contributed to this growth. The United Nations flag, along with the flags of more than sixty represented nations and the U.S. flag, flies in University Hall in honor of the ideal of peaceful international relations.

High participation in formal exchange programs constitutes a third target of the school's international focus. Under a Great Lakes Colleges Association agreement, OWU established an exchange program with Waseda University in 1962 to provide approximately 30 American students with opportunities to study in Japan and 30 Japanese students to study at Ohio Wesleyan each year. The Salamanca program, founded by Conrad Kent in 1988, conducts the exchange of approximately one hundred students and faculty between OWU and the University of Salamanca in Spain. The academic collaboration frequently extends to joint participation in academic symposia: in 1993, members of the Salamanca faculty participated in a symposium on the Golden Age in Salamanca.

=== Libraries ===
The Beeghly Library is the main library of OWU. The library contains nearly 500,000 volumes in its collection, and is also home to the Archives of Ohio United Methodism, the Rare Books, Manuscripts, and Artifacts collection, as well as an archival collection of materials related to the history of the university. It is currently closed for renovations. The Hobson Science Library is part of the Schimmel Conrades Science Center and supports research in the earth, life, and physical sciences. OWU has 11 full-time librarians, with subject liaisons for each academic department, as well as a full-time archivist.

== Student life ==
=== Organizations and activities ===
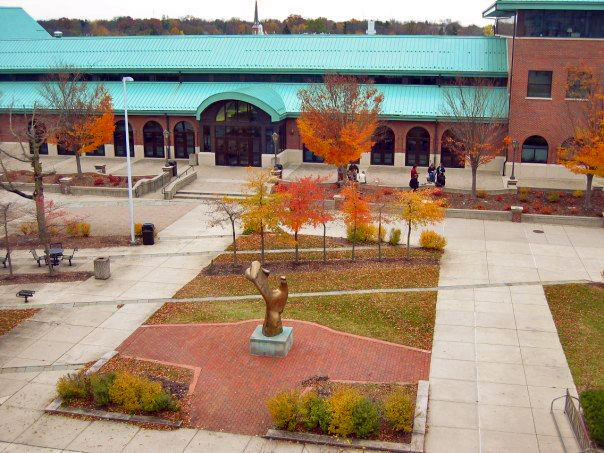
The Hamilton-Williams Campus Center is the campus hub for student activities.

Ohio Wesleyan University has 95 student clubs and organizations. The university offers three chapels as well as several religious groups. There are two a cappella singing groups on campus, "The OWtsiders," a student-run group formed in 1999, and the all-female "Pitch Black" established in 2005. Another entertainment-related club is "The Babbling Bishops", an improvisational comedy troupe. The "Babbling Bishops" started in the fall of 1990 when a group of theatre concentration students formed a performance-oriented project for their theatre degrees. The project became an improv comedy troupe, rehearsing in Stuyvesant Hall and performing with other college improv troupes since 1996.

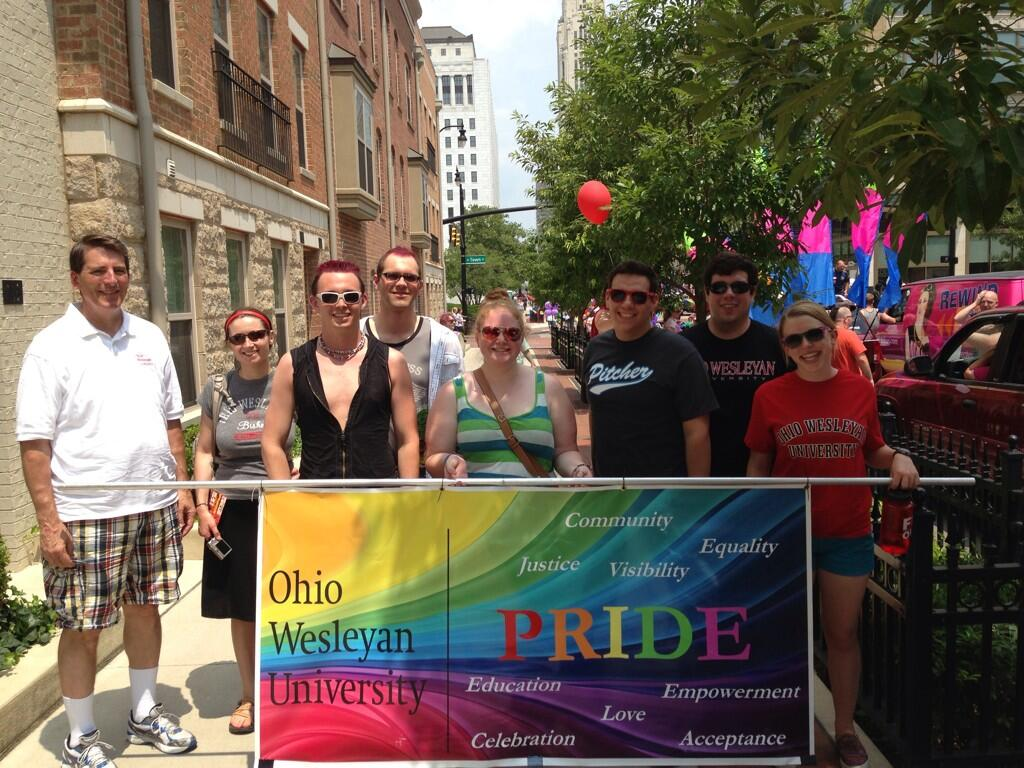
Ohio Wesleyan president with students at the Columbus LGBT Pride Festival 2013.

Socially conscious students can join organizations such as the activist group "Young Democratic Socialists" or participate in student government groups, such as the Campus Programming Board and the Wesleyan Council on Student Affairs. The "PRIDE" organization offers support to OWU's LGBT students.

Fewer than a third of Ohio Wesleyan's students are involved in Greek life, but that percentage has fluctuated significantly throughout the university's history. All six fraternities and five sororities on campus are currently involved in many philanthropic and community programs. The OWU chapter of Phi Kappa Psi (Phi Psi) was closed after the death of Luke Anthony Gabbert, a pledge who fell into a creek in 2016 after drinking large amounts of alcohol.

OWU's oldest student organizations are its literary clubs, including a number of student journals, magazines, and newspapers. The school's student-run weekly newspaper, The Transcript, is the oldest continuously published, independent, college newspaper in the United States. The OWL, an annual literary publication, features students' work and is one of the nation's oldest college literary magazines. Other student publications include The Civic Arts Review, the electronic Connect2OWU bulletin, and @Wesleyan, a quarterly online magazine. OWU Radio, formerly WSLN, broadcasts from Phillips Hall, and offers show times to students, faculty, and local citizens of Delaware.

The university also has a student government, the Wesleyan Council on Student Affairs (WCSA).

=== Activism ===
OWU students make a social and artistic statement on the steps of the Hamilton-Williams Campus Center.

Activism as represented in OWU's founding vision has had a significant role in Ohio Wesleyan's history.

The first president, Edward Thomson, staunchly supported the abolition of slavery and liberalism. Other individuals associated with the university have fought racism. Branch Rickey, an alumnus, broke the racial barrier in baseball. Mary King, a civil rights activist, worked alongside Martin Luther King Jr. in the U.S. civil rights movement while she was a staff member of OWU's Student Nonviolent Coordinating Committee (SNCC). In the 1980s, Ohio Wesleyan's administration fully divested holdings connected to South Africa. As of September 2007, Ohio Wesleyan joined a small group of liberal colleges that opposed the methodology and questioned the usefulness of U.S. News & World Report college rankings, despite the fact that the magazine ranked Ohio Wesleyan highly.

OWU has partisan political groups ranging from liberal to socialist, such the College Democrats and Young Democratic Socialists of America, and several activism awareness groups such as Black Men of the Future, Black Student Union (formerly Student Union on Black Awareness), PRIDE, Viva Latinx, and Rafiki Wa Afrika. Many students complete internships for state representatives in the nearby state capitol, Columbus.

=== Traditions ===
Many Ohio Wesleyan traditions originate from its early years. Monnett Weekend, beginning in 1896, welcomes female alumni, parents, and friends of the university. Events include a "People's Parade" with clowns, banners and marching, faculty lectures, Maypole dancing, Choral Arts Society, and an all-campus carnival. It started as a girls' athletic fête held at the Monnett Athletic Club for Mothers Day. All events were held at the Monnett Campus, where female students danced around the Maypole, while men were barred. The men, in turn, developed their own tradition: they arrived at Monnett Campus early in the morning, and concealed themselves in trees to watch the festivities, discreetly.

In 1884, Ohio Wesleyan held its first Mock Convention, which has recurred in every United States presidential election year since 1920. Its purpose is to inform participants, students, faculty staff, and Ohio residents about the presidential nominating convention, presidential candidate, and key issues in the upcoming election.

Beginning in the 1920s, all freshmen were required to wear "dinks", red caps with black brims and a black W on the front. This tradition ended in the 1960s. The freshman class of 1957 wore dinks for half the first semester.

Ohio Wesleyan's Homecoming takes place in early October, while the Ohio Wesleyan football team plays one of its traditional rivals.

The President's Ball, a recent gala organized by the college president, takes place on the first Saturday of December. Other traditions include OWU vs. Denison, which stages a "fierce" athletic rivalry between Ohio Wesleyan and Denison University; the Sagan Colloquium, spanning the fall semester, recently expanded to include the spring semester, which consists of speeches focusing on an issue of concern to the liberal arts; and Orchesis, an annual celebration of modern dance and the arts, which occurs at the end of the academic year. "Fresh-X" is an optional program for newly admitted students that occurs just before orientation in which students may choose between hiking, backpacking and other outdoor activities to make friends with their new classmates.

The campus used to host two major musical events, Unity through Music and Springfest. Unity through Music occurred once a year in the fall semester, and covered various musical styles in a carnival atmosphere, during the day; during the evening, a huge dance is held in the Hamilton-Williams Campus Center. Springfest, the second musical event, proceeded in mid-April and had featured well-known music groups such as Counting Crows, The Roots, Guster, Ben Folds, and Gym Class Heroes. It was organized by the Campus Programming Board, who have changed the name to "Bishop Bash," in an attempt to create more campus pride.

A rock next to Hayes Hall has been part of the residential campus for the last 50 years, and students continually repaint it with graffiti and slogans.

=== Housing ===
The university can house up to 1,600 students on campus. First-year students are required to live on campus in Smith Hall during their first two semesters. A lottery system matches second to fourth-year students with dormitories and another lottery system determines how many students are allowed to live in off-campus housing. Housing options include dormitories, small living units, fraternities, and cooperative housing.

Thomson, Bashford, Stuyvesant, and Smith Halls are large mid-rise dormitories on campus. Welch Hall is designated as a "quiet" dorm for honors students. Hayes Hall is an all-female dorm.

Approximately 90 non-freshmen students live in Small Living Units (SLUs), which are co-ops united voluntarily to meet shared economic, social, and cultural needs and aspirations in democratically controlled houses. The houses allow students to live cooperatively with one another by sharing regularly scheduled house chores, participating in the decision process, and, in some, sharing the cooking duties. Each unit houses a group of 10–17 students, and is organized to promote a common theme, usually indicated by the co-op's name. As of the 2022–2023 academic year, the SLUs consist of The Creative Arts House; The Citizens of the World House; The Sexuality and Gender Equality House; The House of Linguistic Diversity (HOLD); LA CASA; The Tree House; The Service, Engagement, and Leadership House; and The Interfaith House. The university owns these houses; the co-ops, therefore, must follow the university's living policies. The co-ops do, however, elect their own members and do not have resident advisers or faculty in residence like other on-campus residence halls. They have a House Moderator who is selected by Residential Life and undergoes the same training as a resident advisor. At the end of each calendar year, every existing and potential co-op must submit a house proposal describing its plans for theme promotion for the next academic year. The University Housing office places co-ops in houses every year on a competitive basis. In addition the school offers Theme Houses, which do not have to go through the renewal process. They include the Honors House (HoHo) and House of Black Culture.

Off-campus housing is available only to students residing in Delaware, Ohio while living with their spouse or direct family; 17 percent of students live off-campus. Most students assert Ohio Wesleyan's policy of off-campus housing as one of the "worst things" about Ohio Wesleyan.

== Athletics ==
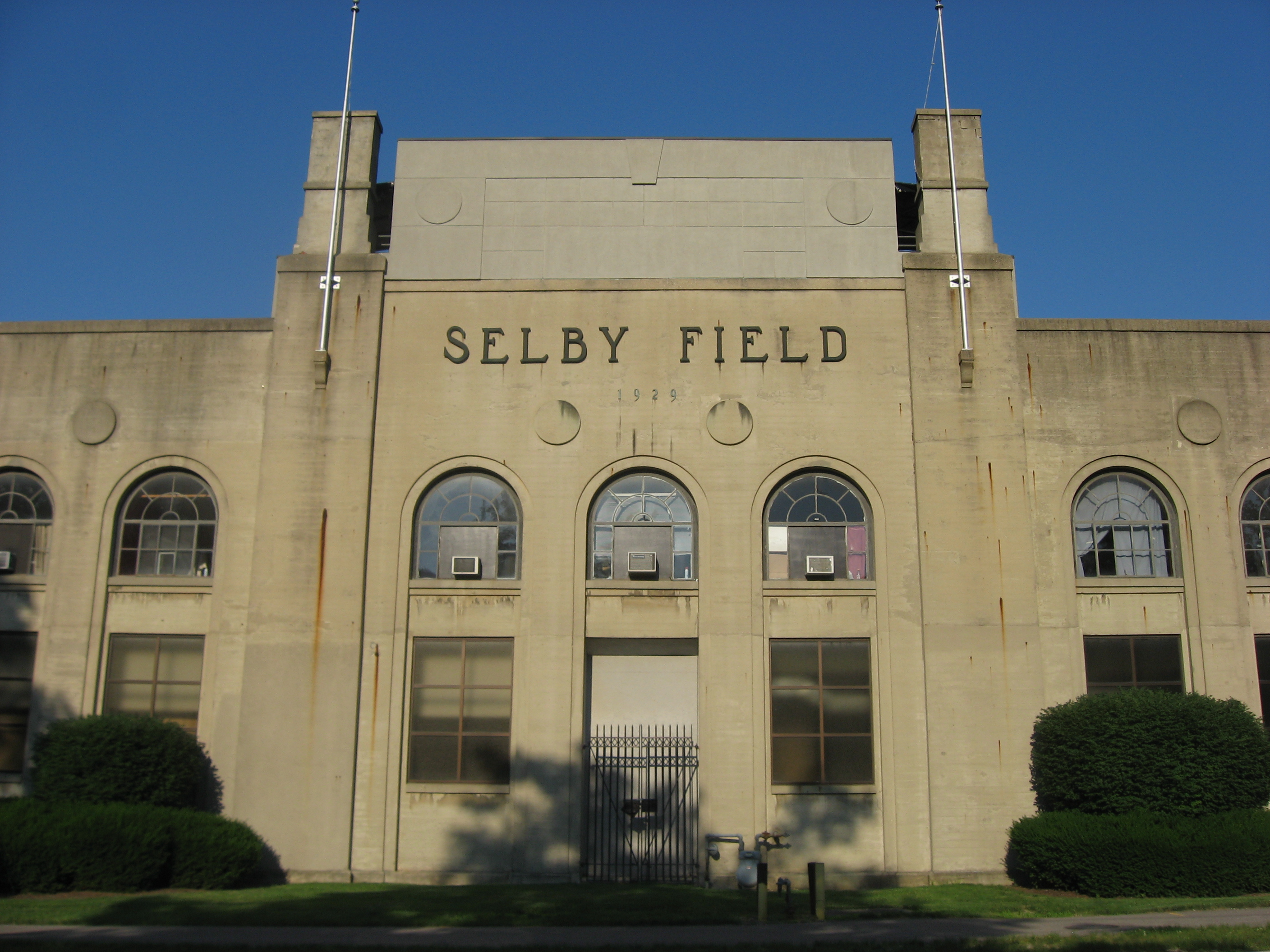
Selby Field is home to OWU's football, lacrosse, and field hockey teams.

Ohio Wesleyan participates in the NCAA's Division III as a member of the North Coast Athletic Conference (NCAC). Known as the Battling Bishops, Ohio Wesleyan competes in 25 varsity men's and women's sports. The newest sports, men's wrestling and women's rowing, begin competition during the 2018–2019 academic year. The official school colors are red and black. Formal athletics at the college date to 1875, when the first football teams were organized to play against other institutions. In the late 1880s, Ohio Wesleyan had perhaps the strongest amateur baseball team in the state of Ohio behind the pitching of Phil "Lefty" Saylor. The school joined the Ohio Athletic Conference in 1902. In 1983, Ohio Wesleyan joined with nine other colleges in Ohio, Indiana and Pennsylvania to create the North Coast Athletic Conference. The NCAC seeks to bring together a group of liberal arts institutions that value the primacy of the academic mission over the athletic one.

The men's lacrosse, golf and soccer teams are the most historically successful of the varsity teams, and soccer is the university's most intently followed sport. For seven of the last twelve years, Ohio Wesleyan has won the NCAC conference All-Sports Trophy for excellence in both women's and men's sports. In the Sears Director's Cup standings, OWU is among the top 25 overall collegiate athletics programs in the country. Because of the North Coast Athletic Association athletic agreement, the university is not permitted to offer academic scholarships for athletic recruiting.

Ohio Wesleyan has won five NCAA Division III Championships, including men's basketball (1988), men's soccer (1998 and 2011), and women's soccer (2001 and 2002). In addition, Ohio Wesleyan's varsity athletic teams have been NCAC champions over 100 times, leading the Denison Big Red and the Kenyon Owls.

The nickname The Battling Bishops dates to 1925. This is also the name of the university's mascot, The Battling Bishop. Due to its ironic name, the mascot has been listed as one of the weirdest college mascots. Due to its red robe, The Battling Bishop looks actually like a Cardinal. Before 1925, Ohio Wesleyan's teams were referred to as "The Red and Black" and "The Methodists". Many schools, including several other Methodist ones, also claimed crimson and black as their colors, so the university decided to change the name.

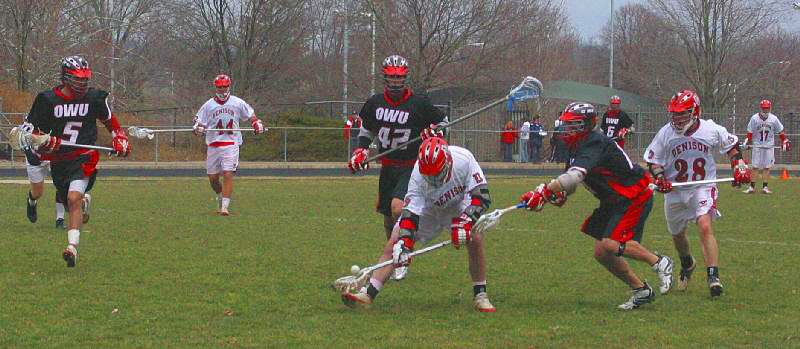
The men's lacrosse team at Selby Field.

Ohio Wesleyan maintains athletic rivalries with other NCAC institutions. The men's lacrosse team has a historic rivalry with the Denison Big Red, the football team with the Wittenberg Tigers, the soccer team with the Kenyon Owls, and the field hockey team with the Oberlin Yeomen. Both Denison and Ohio Wesleyan issued alerts to their fans specifically for the OWU-Denison lacrosse game about unsportsmanlike behavior and profanity.

In addition to the school's varsity athletics, club sports teams, including ultimate Frisbee, chess, indoor hockey, cricket, rugby, ski, and scuba, have been organized as student organizations under the auspices of the Office of Student Activities. Ohio Wesleyan's intramural program includes 16 sports. Sports such as skiing, squash, and water polo have been offered, as well as a sports trivia competition.

"Oh we're from dear old Wesleyan" is Ohio Wesleyan University's primary fight song. The song's lyrics were written in 1914 by Chass Cupett '1916.

== People ==
=== Administration ===
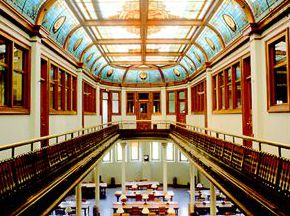
Slocum Hall, originally opened as OWU's library in 1898.

Under the charter granted by the State of Ohio, the board of trustees possesses the legal authority to operate the college. The charter and bylaws stipulate a board of 34 trustees, of whom one is the president. In general, it is the board that elects the president. Since Ohio Wesleyan's beginnings, sixteen people have held the title of president, and a few have served as interim president. Former presidents include lawyers, literary scholars, politicians, executives, and clergymen.

After several disagreements between Huddleston and the Ohio Wesleyan administration, Huddleston accepted a position as president of the University of New Hampshire and left Ohio Wesleyan on June 30, 2007, giving him the second shortest presidency, behind David Lockmiller, 1959–1961. On May 29, 2007, the appointment of current university provost Dr. David O. Robbins as interim president was unanimously endorsed by OWU's board of trustees. Dr. Robbins' term as Interim President began on July 1, 2007.

On December 17, 2007, Dr. Rockwell "Rock" Jones was elected to serve as the 16th president of Ohio Wesleyan University. Dr. Jones' inauguration ceremony took place on October 10, 2008, in Ohio Wesleyan's Gray Chapel, in University Hall.

=== Alumni ===
Ohio Wesleyan alumni are active in several annual events, organizations, and initiatives. The events and associations with significant alumni involvement are Homecoming, 'W' Association, and A/PART (the alumni admission team). For the 2005–2006 fiscal year, Ohio Wesleyan's alumni giving rate was 35%. A number of the school's alumni have made notable contributions in the fields of government, law, academia, business, arts, journalism, and athletics, among others.

In academia, Frank Sherwood Rowland (class of 1948) won the 1995 Nobel Prize for chemistry for his research on the depletion of the Earth's ozone layer. Ezra Vogel (1950) is a prominent author on China-Japan issues and was the director of Harvard's Fairbank Center for East Asian Research from 1995 to 1999. William Hsiao (1963) is an economist in the field of international health at Harvard, and the designer of a landmark study to examine the United States' system of reimbursing physicians for medical services. Dennis R. Appleyard (1961) is the author of an international economics textbook.

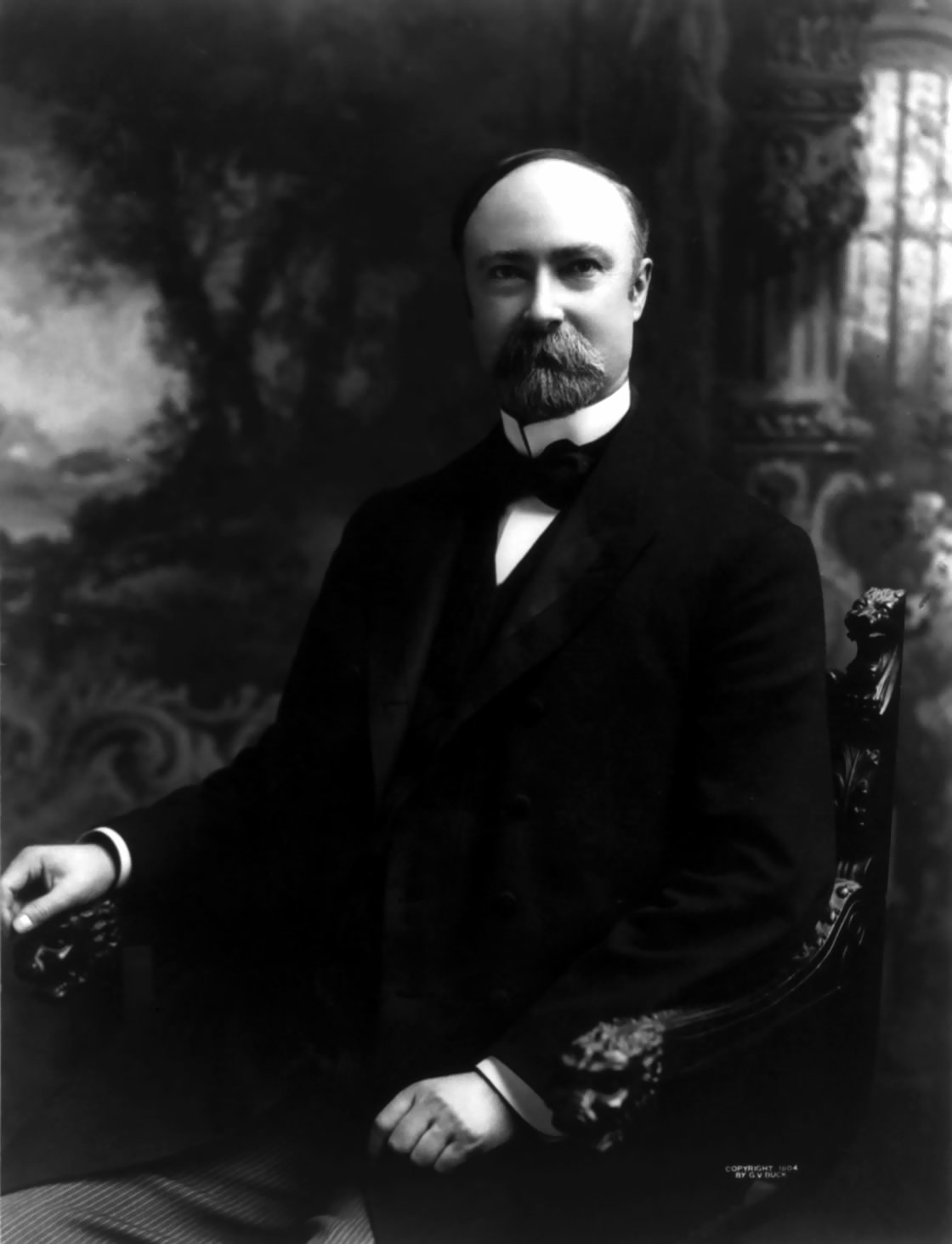
Charles Fairbanks

Frank Sherwood Rowland

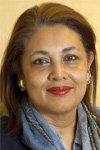
Shirin R. Tahir-Kheli

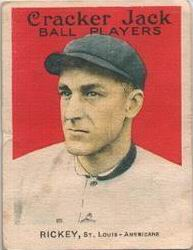
Branch Rickey

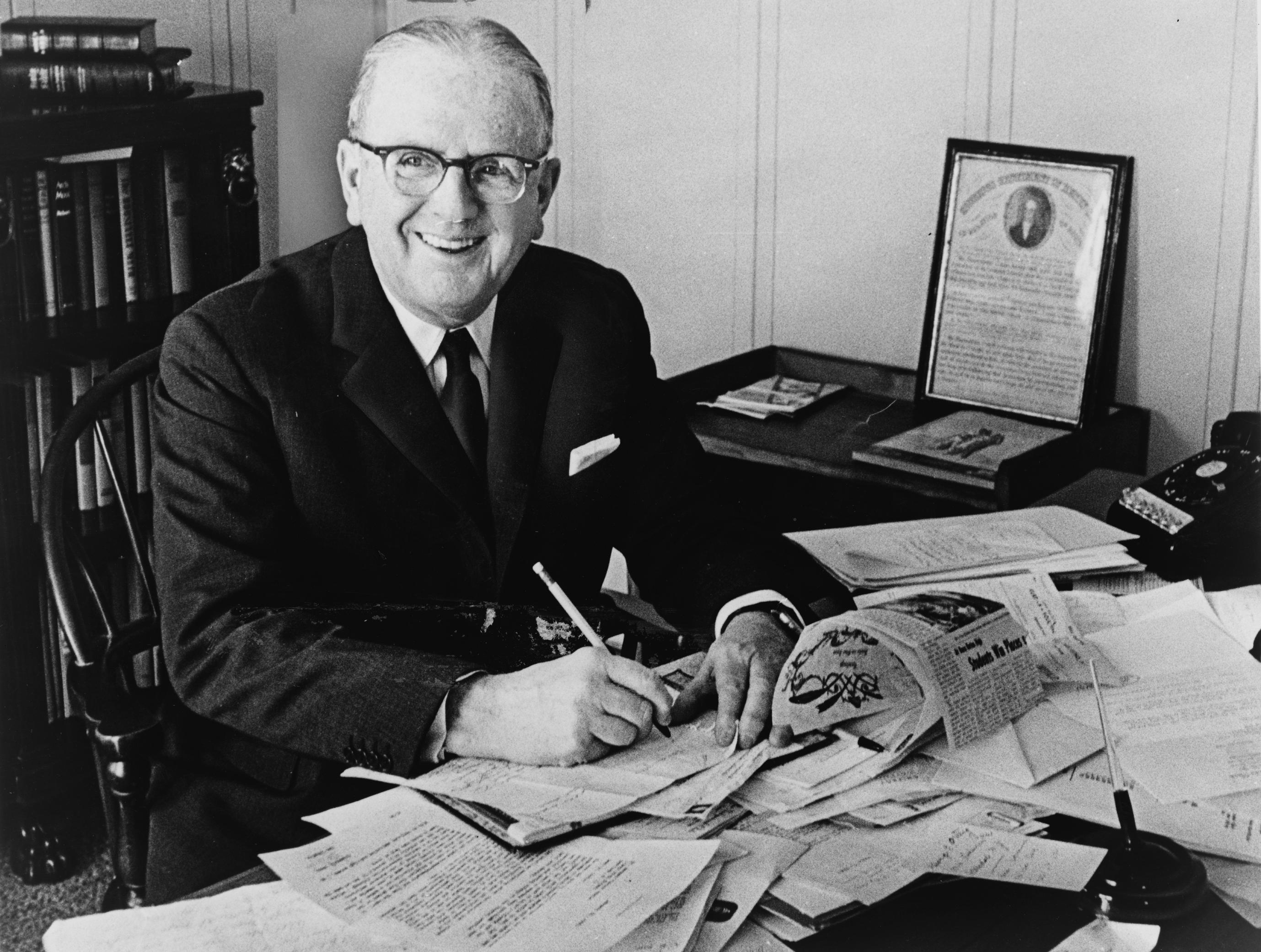
Norman Vincent Peale

In politics, Kathryn Barger serves as Los Angeles County's Fifth District Supervisor; Barger graduated in 1983. John Wesley Hoyt (1849) was the third Governor of the Wyoming Territory. Charles Fairbanks (1872) was the 26th Vice-President of the United States. Jo Ann Emerson (1972) served as a U.S. Representative from Missouri. Arthur Flemming (1927) was a Secretary of Health, Education and Welfare, was known for his commitment to civil rights, was the recipient of two Presidential Medals of Freedom, and served as president of University of Oregon, Ohio Wesleyan University, and Macalester College. Lucy Webb Hayes (1853), wife of U.S. President Rutherford B. Hayes, was the first woman to be called First Lady, and the first First Lady to hold a college degree.

Notable journalists and media personalities include Frank Stanton (1930), a president of CBS known for supporting broadcast journalism before Congress; Byron Pitts (1982), a national correspondent for CBS News; Wendie Malick (1972), an Emmy-nominated actress known for her role on the NBC sitcom Just Shoot Me! and now as "Victoria Chase" on the TV Land sitcom "Hot in Cleveland"; Melvin Van Peebles (1953), an actor, director, screenwriter, playwright, and composer; Patricia Wettig (1974), the actress who plays vice president Caroline Richards on Prison Break; and Clark Gregg (1984), the actor playing Richard in The New Adventures of Old Christine with Julia Louis-Dreyfus.

Numerous Ohio Wesleyan alumni have been associated with social justice. Branch Rickey (1904) was a baseball manager and executive known for signing Jackie Robinson as the first African-American in Major League Baseball. Another graduate, Mary King (1962), worked alongside the Rev. Dr. Martin Luther King Jr. in the U.S. civil rights movement when she was a young student, and was a member of the staff of the Student Nonviolent Coordinating Committee (SNCC). Rev. Norman Vincent Peale (1920) was the author of The Power of Positive Thinking and the winner of a Presidential Medal of Freedom for his theological contributions. Others found fame in other forms: Mildred Elizabeth Sisk (aka Axis Sally) was the first American woman to be tried and sentenced for treason, convicted of broadcasting for Nazi Germany during World War II. In 1917, she majored in dramatic arts, but did not graduate due to her failure to meet all university requirements. After serving a 12-year sentence, Sisk returned to OWU, where she received a bachelor's degree in speech in 1973. James J. Nance an Ohio born industrialist who became president of Hot-Point and later the Studebaker-Packard Corporation. He became chief executive of the Central National Bank of Cleveland, chairman of the executive committee of Montgomery Ward and chairman of the board of trustees of the Cleveland State University.
