= Schimmel-Conrades Science Center =

Coordinates: 40°17′44″N 83°03′54″W

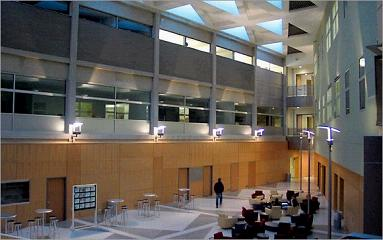
Science Center at Ohio Wesleyan University

The Schimmel-Conrades Science Center is a science building at Ohio Wesleyan University.

The Science Center involved the renovation of 100,000 square feet (9,290 m²) of indoor space, including physically connecting the two old science facilities, constructing 52,000 square feet (4,830 m²) of additional space, and creating an expanded and integrated science library, amphitheatre, and three-story atrium.

The Science Center includes a cafe and vending machines. The floorspace is used for events ranging from the annual President's Ball to regular poster sessions.
