= Five Colleges of Ohio =

Consortium of private liberal arts colleges in Ohio, US

The Five Colleges of Ohio
- Formation: 1995
- Legal status: Association of American-based colleges
- Region served: Ohio, United States
- Members: Denison University; Kenyon College; Oberlin College; Ohio Wesleyan University; The College of Wooster
- Chair: Matthew vandenBerg
- Website: ohio5.org

The Five Colleges of Ohio, Inc. is an American academic and administrative consortium of five private liberal arts colleges in the state of Ohio. It is a nonprofit educational consortium established in 1995 to promote the broad educational and cultural objectives of its member institutions.

== Members ==
The members of The Five Colleges of Ohio consortium are:

- Denison University, Granville, Ohio
- Kenyon College, Gambier, Ohio
- Oberlin College, Oberlin, Ohio
- Ohio Wesleyan University, Delaware, Ohio
- The College of Wooster, Wooster, Ohio

== History ==
The designation Ohio Five first appeared in Ohio newspapers in the early twentieth century. The grouping, predating any formal agreement, was immediately adopted by the press as a foreshadowing of an Ohio league of schools with similar academic and athletic reputations, which at the time was a common perception.

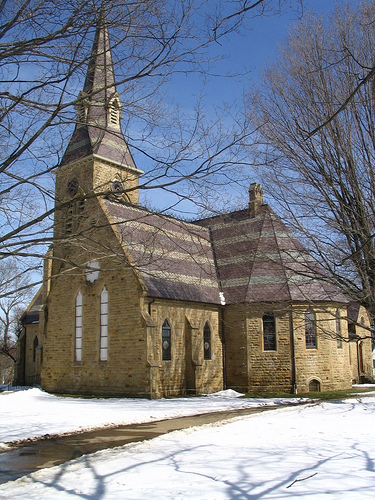
The Church of the Holy Spirit at the Kenyon College

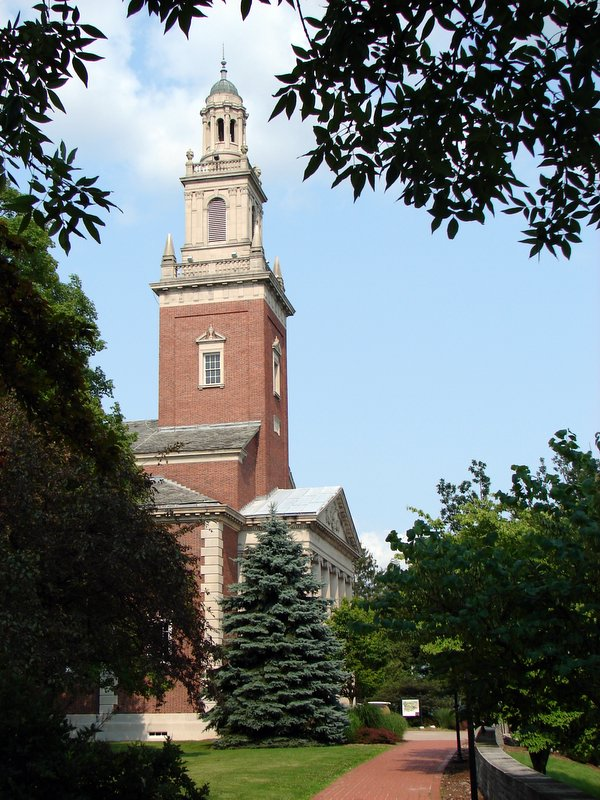
Denison's Swasey Chapel

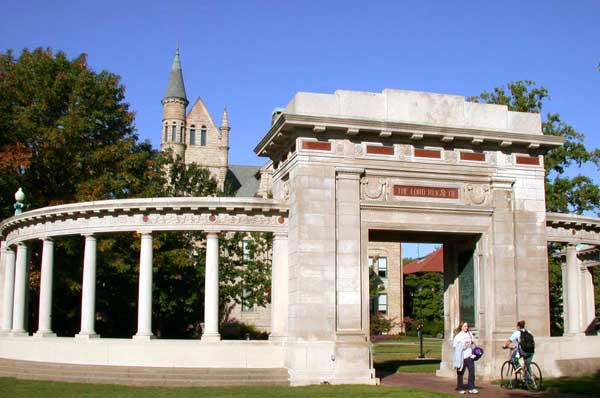
Oberlin's Memorial Arch

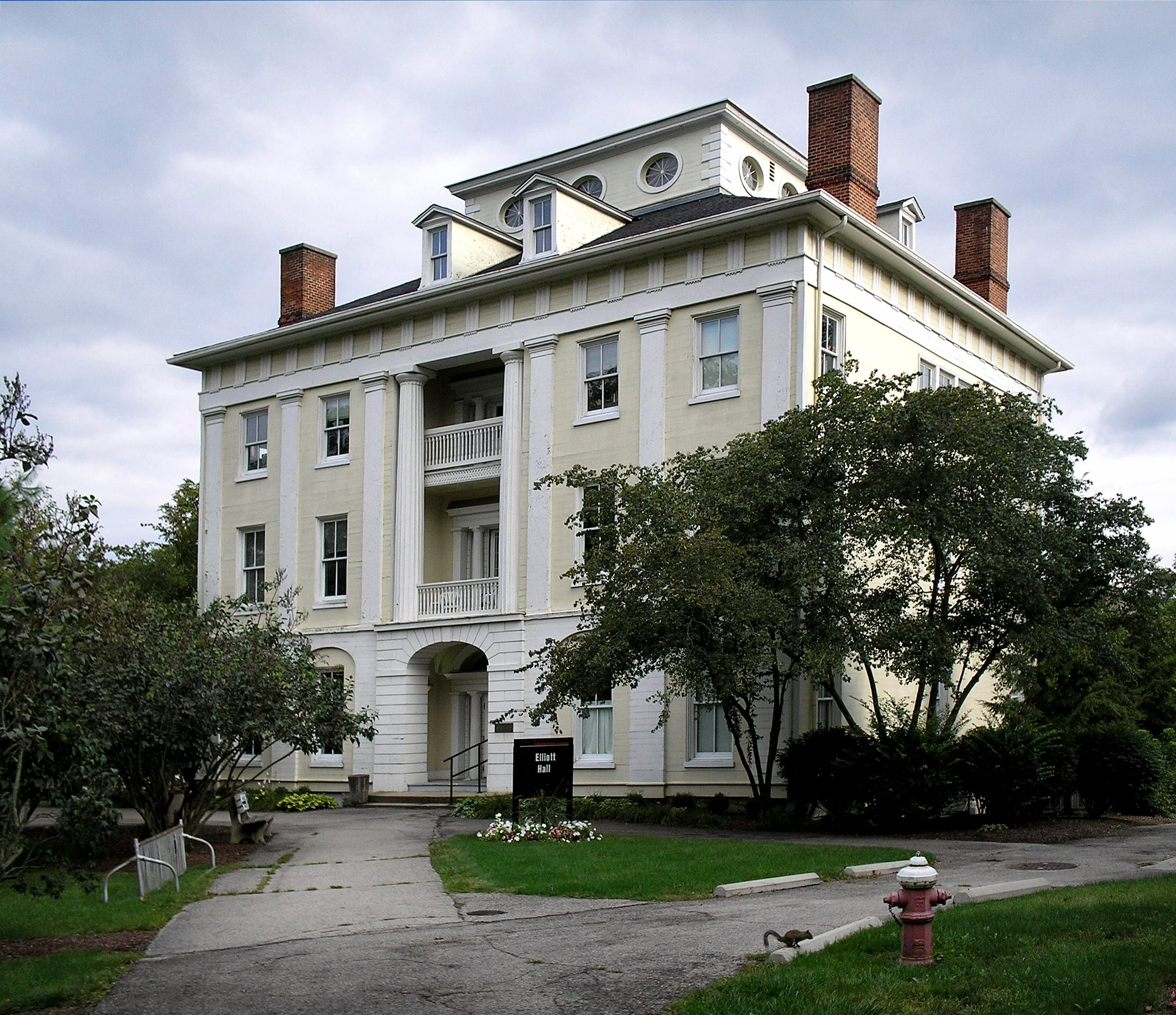
Elliott Hall at Ohio Wesleyan

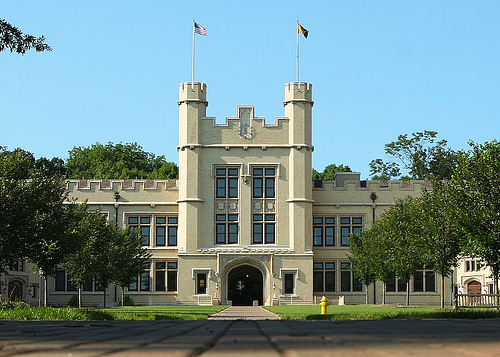
Kauke Hall at The College of Wooster

Following informal discussions among the five colleges in the early 1990s, the consortium was formalized by the incorporation of the organization on June 30, 1995. A grant from the Andrew W. Mellon Foundation, awarded in June 1995, provided for the development of a joint library system, establishment of an administrative structure, and investigation of the benefits and methods for sharing digital images and multimedia resources, establishing The Five Colleges of Ohio, Inc. as a legal entity.

Collaboration among the five colleges occurs in several areas:

- Academic Programs
- Administrative Programs and Technology
- Libraries

== Academic programs ==
The colleges have worked together on grants and long-term projects to support curricular development, faculty collaborations, and opportunities for students. These projects have included:

In language teaching:

- Foreign Language Technology Project (1996-2002) a four-year project funded by The Andrew W. Mellon Foundation to strengthen foreign language learning through collaborative use of technology
- Language Enrichment and Postdoctoral Fellowship Program (2015-), a Mellon-funded program which placed thirteen postdoctoral fellows in languages from The Ohio State University for two-year terms and provided opportunities for faculty to collaborate on teaching and scholarship project. In its final phase in 2018-19, the project included a test of three advanced Chinese language courses shared among four of the colleges via distance technology.

In curricular development:

- Teagle Creativity and Critical Thinking Assessment 2005-2006, a multi-year project funded by The Teagle Foundation that developed tools to assess outcomes of a liberal arts education: creativity and critical thinking.
- Teagle Curricular Coherence Project 2015-2019 supported a comprehensive initiative offering structured ways for students to complete general education requirements and create coherent understanding of their educational pathways.

In student opportunities:

- Ohio Five-OSU Summer Undergraduate Research Experience (SURE) offers science students at the Five Colleges of Ohio an opportunity to engage in summer research activities in Ohio State University laboratories.
- Stanford-Ohio Five structural molecular biology collaboration provides internship opportunities at the Stanford Synchrotron Radiation Lightsource (SSRL.)

In faculty collaborations:

Ohio Five Dance Workshops support an annual showcase of faculty and student dance performances at member colleges.

== Administrative programs ==
In 2012, the Ohio Five resolved to identify and implement a joint e-procurement solution to automate purchasing and contract administration across the colleges and realize related savings through joint purchasing plans and contracts. A $100,000 grant from the Mellon Foundation in 2014 supported system installation and a full-time staff member was hired to supervise the program. Denison University, Kenyon College, Oberlin College and Ohio Wesleyan University moved forward together to develop the program, which realized an estimated $500,000 in contract savings in its first fully implemented year in 2015-16. In 2017-18, more than 4,300 suppliers were active in the e-procurement system representing an annual spend of $4.483 million.

Since 2014, the Five Colleges have also collaborated on a shared online work order system enabling the colleges to optimize workflow in facilities management and maintenance and track expenditures.

Risk management, disaster planning, Title IX training and investigative services and information technologies represent additional areas in which the college work together to support training and cost savings. The Ohio Five also maintains a job site for employment opportunities in faculty, staff, and administration at the Five Colleges

== Libraries ==
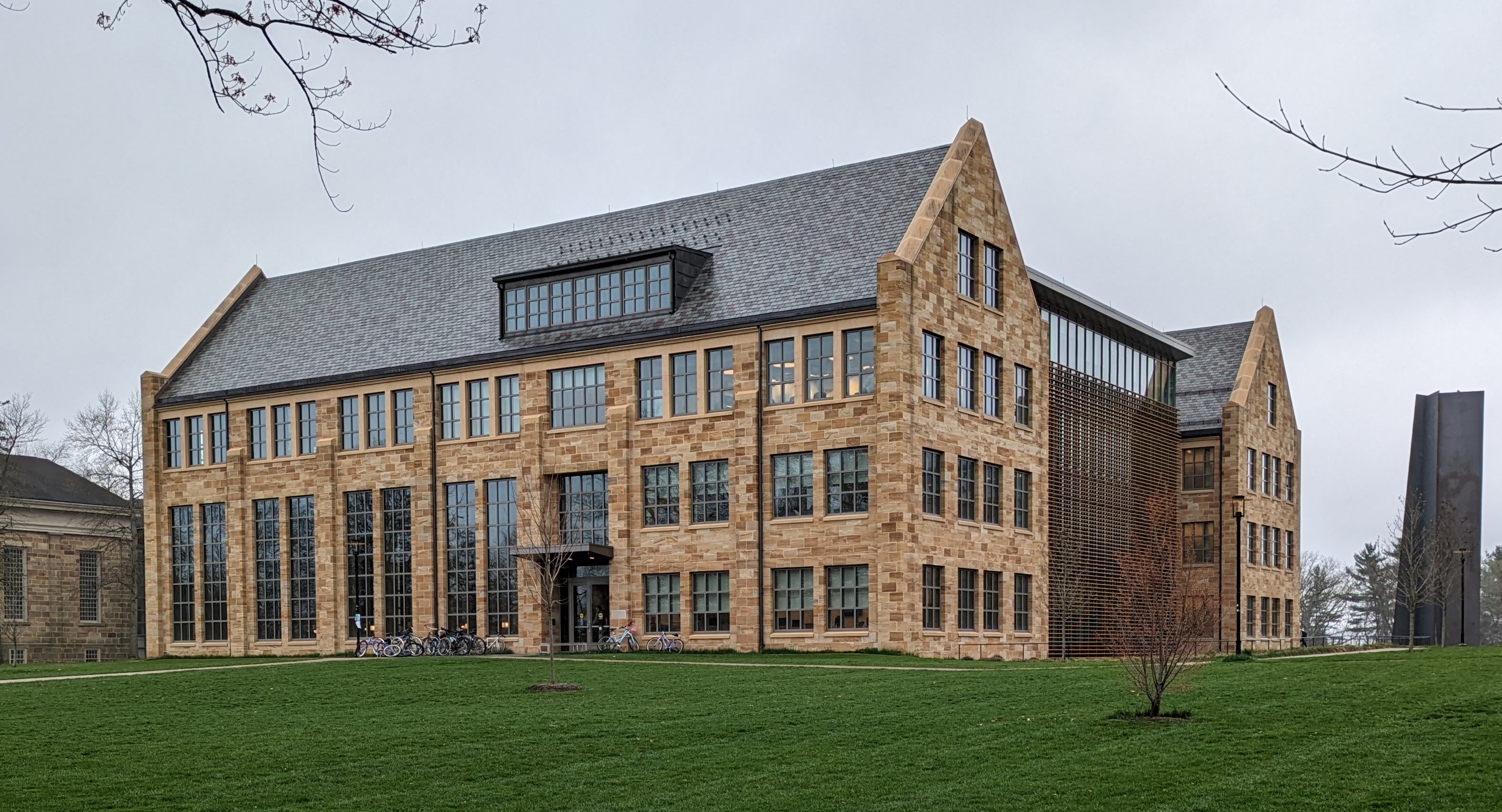
Chalmers Library at Kenyon College

The libraries of Denison University, Kenyon College, Ohio Wesleyan University, and The College of Wooster share an integrated library system called CONSORT. This multi-college system maximizes the colleges' abilities to share collection resources and collaborate on collection-related databases and publications. Oberlin College maintains its own integrated library system called OBIS.

Since the founding of the Five Colleges, its libraries have worked together to support the development of the CONSORT system and promote institutional priorities in digital literacy and digital scholarship. Joint library projects have included:

- Information Literacy Web Tutorials (1998) a project funded by the Foundation for Independent Higher Education and A T & T.

The Andrew W. Mellon Foundation provided significant support for three projects focusing on digital scholarship:

- Integrating Informational Literacy into the Liberal Arts Curriculum (1999), a project to support curricular innovations to deepen student capacity in using information resources.
- Next Generation Library and Digital Collections (2009–11), which funded the development of digital collections by faculty and librarians
- Digital Collections: From Projects to Pedagogy and Scholarship (2013-), which created digital resources to enhance faculty and student research, teaching, and learning using emerging aspects of media literacy, scholarly communication, information literacy, information management and digital publishing.

== Governance ==
The Five Colleges of Ohio is governed by its five presidents who form the organization's board of trustees. Standing committees led by cabinet officers of each college supervise finance and business operations (chief financial and business officers), academic affairs (provosts and deans), library programs (library directors) and information technology (chief financial officers). The Five Colleges of Ohio is managed by a full-time staff of five who supervise the organization's activities from offices located throughout the consortium, with a central office at Oberlin College.
