= Thornwell =

Thornwell may refer to:

- Thornwell, Louisiana, an unincorporated community in Jefferson Davis Parish
- Thornwell Orphanage, in Clinton, South Carolina
- James Robert Thornwell (1937-1984), US Army private unwittingly administered LSD by Army intelligence in 1961.
- James Henley Thornwell (1812–1862), American Presbyterian preacher and religious writer
- Sindarius Thornwell (born 1994), American College basketball player
- Thornwell Jacobs (1877–1956), educator, author, and Presbyterian minister

== See also ==
- Thornwell–Presbyterian College Historic District, located in Clinton, Laurens County, South Carolina
- Thornwell-Elliott House, historic home located at Fort Mill, York County, South Carolina
- George Thornewell (1898–1986), English international footballer
- Thörnell, a surname
