= Thornwell Jacobs =

American minister, author, and educator (1877–1956)

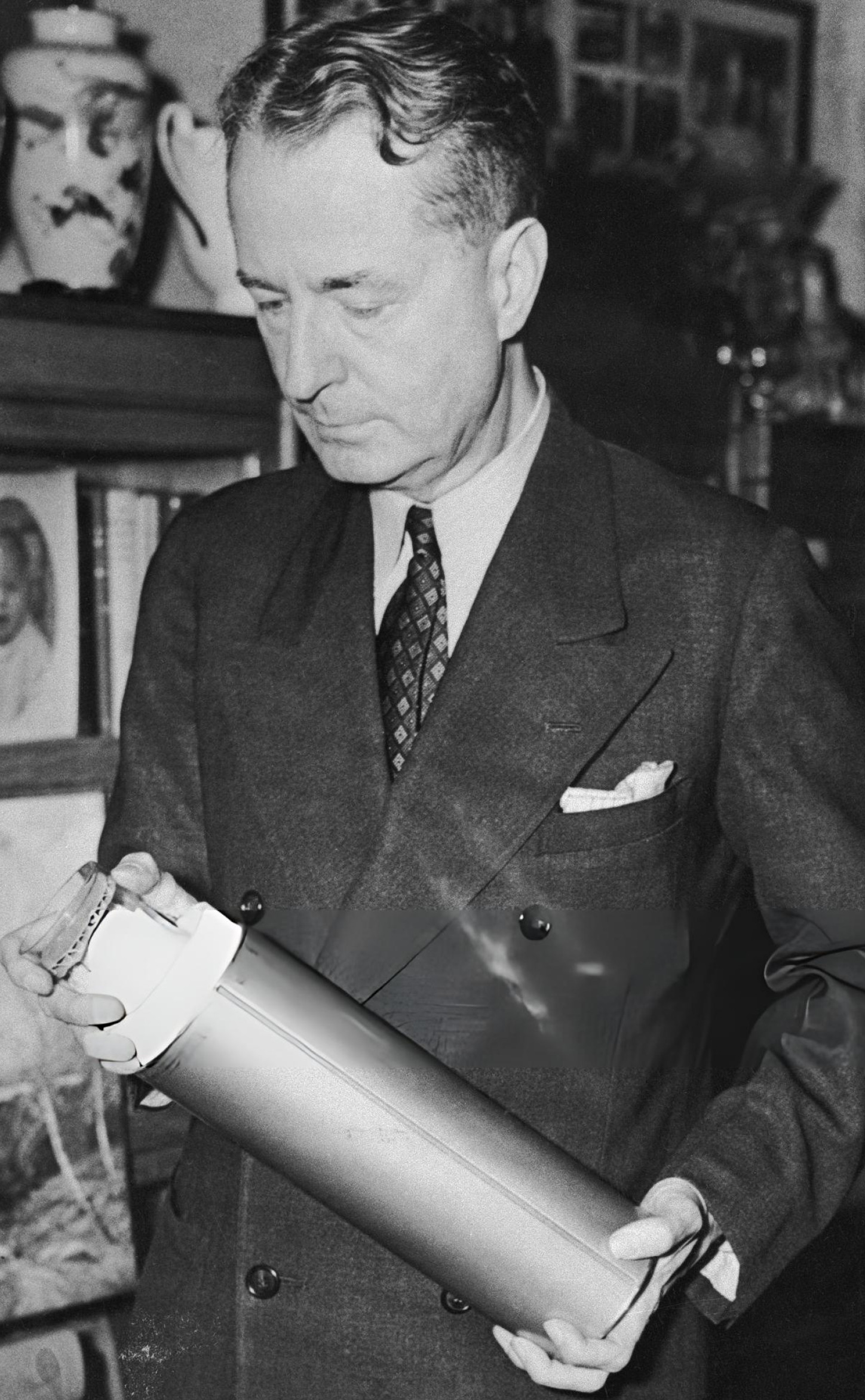
- Jacobs in 1940, sealing the last object holder to go into the Crypt of Civilization
- Born: 15 February 1877; Clinton, South Carolina
- Died: 4 August 1956 (aged 79); Clinton, South Carolina
- Occupations: Presbyterian minister, author, educator, business executive
- Known for: educator, "time capsule"
- Parent(s): William Plumer Jacobs; Mary Jane (Dillard)

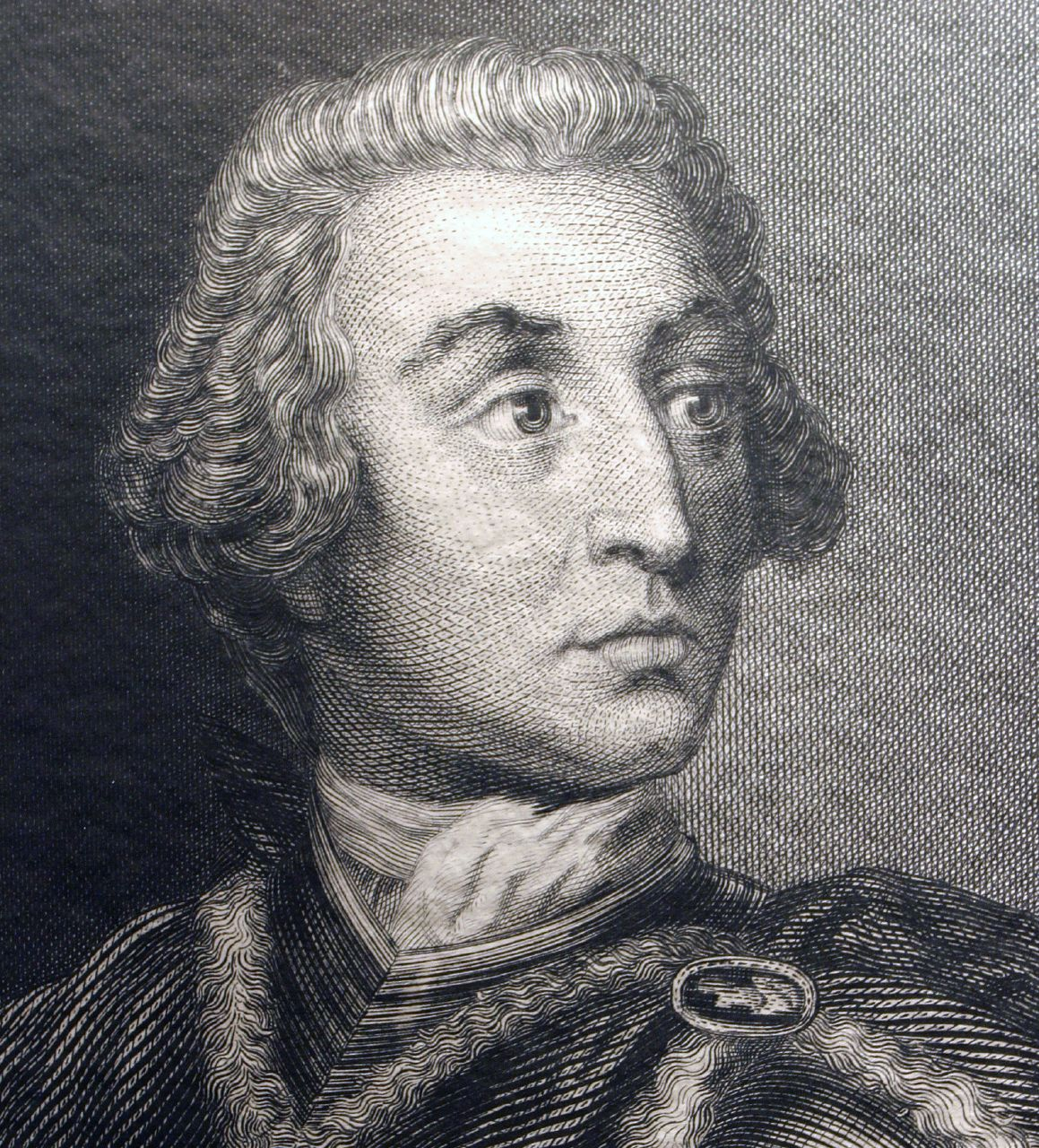
General James Oglethorpe

Thornwell Jacobs (February 15, 1877 – August 4, 1956) was a professor, historian, author, fundraiser, university founder, and Presbyterian minister. He earned degrees from Presbyterian College in South Carolina and the Princeton Theological Seminary in New Jersey. He wrote The Law of White Circle, a novel about mulattos set during the Atlanta race massacre of 1906.

Jacobs reestablished Oglethorpe University, becoming its president and developing intense educational programs. His motivation for this was that his grandfather attended the original college and told him of educated people that had graduated from it to become productive citizens in society. Unfortunately, it had been forced to cease functioning because of the American Civil War.

He conceived the Crypt of Civilization time capsule idea for a historic time collection of 1930s cultural objects sealed in a specially designed place on campus for people of the 82nd century to find to see how the people on Earth lived in the 20th century.

== Early life ==
Jacobs was born to the Reverend William Plumer Jacobs and the former Mary Jane Dillard at Thornwell Orphanage in Clinton, South Carolina, on February 15, 1877. The orphanage was organized and developed by his father. Jacobs learned the printing trade in his early teens. In 1895, when he was 18 years old, he earned a Bachelor of Arts degree in 1894 and Master of Arts degree from Presbyterian College of South Carolina in 1895. He was later honored by his alma mater with the Doctor of Letters degree. After that he attended Princeton Theological Seminary in New Jersey and graduated in 1899 with a Bachelor of Divinity degree.

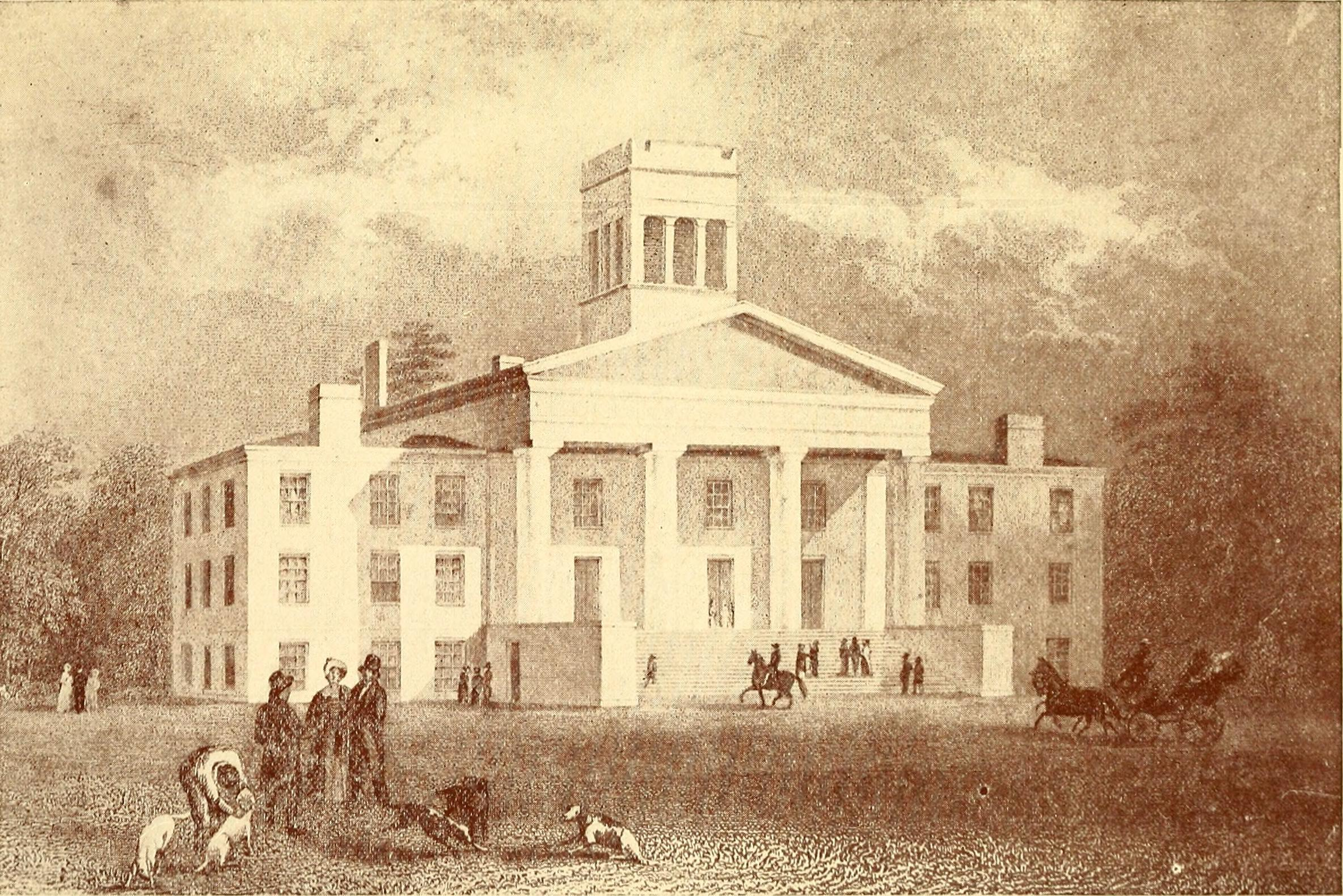
Oglethorpe University, c 1920

== Adult life ==
Jacobs served as a Presbyterian pastor in Morganton, North Carolina, from 1900 to 1903. After this time he became vice president of Thornwell Orphanage and began fundraising for the organization. In 1905, Jacobs became involved in religious publications in Nashville, Tennessee. He visited Atlanta after the Atlanta Massacre race riots of September 1906 and then in Nashville wrote a novel based on it about the mulatto as a third race, The Law of White Circle (1908).

In 1909, Jacobs returned to Atlanta for a fundraising project to benefit the growth of Agnes Scott College. He then established a Presbyterian college in Atlanta. He also planned to reestablish the old Oglethorpe University near Atlanta, where his grandfather, Ferdinand, had been a faculty member. His grandfather had told him stories about the university's graduates; some were governors, some were poets, some were ministers, some were farmers, and some were merchants. Oglethorpe University, named for British General James Edward Oglethorpe the founder of the colony of Georgia and the first governor of the state of Georgia, was chartered a Presbyterian institution in 1835. The college had been closed during the American Civil War (1861–1865).

Jacobs started the religious publication Westminster Magazine in 1911 which promoted the reestablishing of Oglethorpe University as a college again. Jacobs reopened the school of higher education and reestablished it from 1913 to 1916. He restored and rebuilt the old college from a fund he raised of $500,000 (equivalent to $14,793,578 in 2025). He became its president on January 21, 1915, and continued in that position for nearly 30 years until 1944. As a salesman, Jacobs was able to get financial backers for Oglethorpe University like J.T. Lupton, a Chattanooga Coca-Cola bottling businessman, who gave $100,000 for the hall that bears his name at the university. Jacobs was able to get newspaper czar William Randolph Hearst to give a quarter of a million dollars cash and other donations to the university. According to Judson C. Ward, historian and vice president of Emory University, Jacobs was an outstanding salesman, master showman, and man of ideas with a flair for attracting publicity.

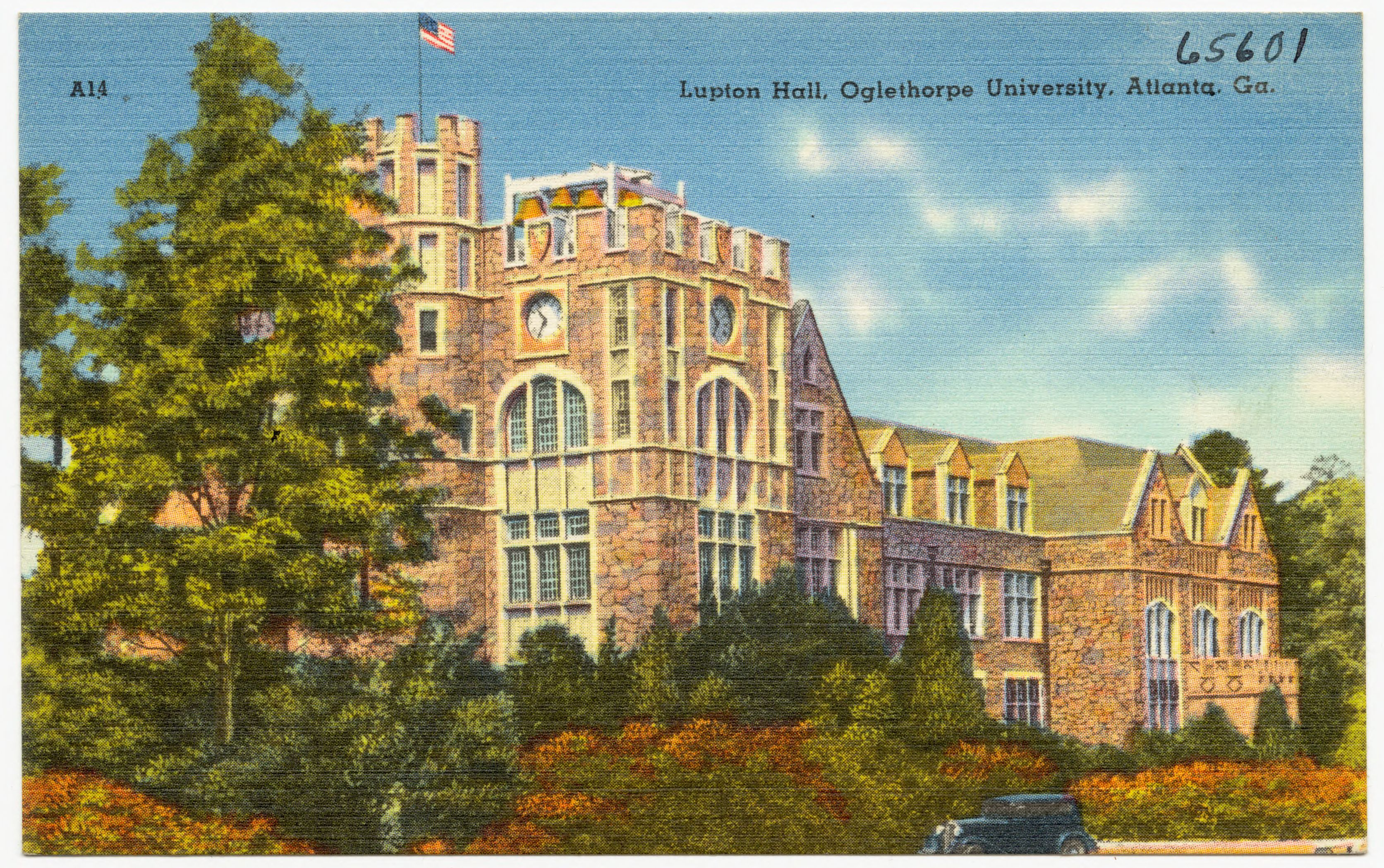
Oglethorpe University, Lupton Hall, c. 1939

== Educational experiment ==
In 1939, Jacobs set up an Exceptional Educational Experiment training for an 11-man "brain team" at Oglethorpe University. He selected young men from the top 10 percent of recent high school graduates for his intense university program. In the unique educational experiment, team members were to stay in college six years and do two to three times as much work as an average student. Jacobs predicted that they would learn at least four times as much as other students. He theorized that his students would go through the sum of available human knowledge much sooner, finding the task no harder than ordinary studies to ordinary students. It was anticipated the students would have a half dozen ways to make a living with above-average wages. There was a 21-year-old assistant coach by the name of Frederick Goss who had the leader title of Don as a person of distinction. Jacobs raised funds to finance the students through the six years involved.

The team's daily routine was to start classes at 7 am and attend until 1:30 pm. They could then play and exercise for a while. Then in the afternoon, they would continue their studies until 10:45 pm. They could participate in extracurricular activities except for fraternities, which were thought to interfere with their studies. The average student typically studied 15 hours' class work a week, but the brain team would apply 25 to 30 hours a week. The average student attended college 8 months a year, but Jacobs' team would attend the college 11 months out of the year. The courses taught at the university included astronomy, geology, paleontology, and anthropology, as well as various types of art, physical exercise, shorthand, Greek, French, German, Italian, Spanish and philosophy.

One winner of the six-year Oglethorpe scholarship, Marshall Asher Jr of Athens, Texas, gave details of his experiences as a member of the brain team. He explained that he entered a statewide contest for the scholarship in the summer following his high school graduation, and he earned high scores on a comprehensive set of exams. In the middle of September 1939, he was notified to report to Oglethorpe to replace a member of the experiment that dropped out. When he arrived, the first thing that happened was that he met the other ten young men participating in the program. Then he was notified of the conditions regulating the scholarship. He was guaranteed room, board, and regular school fees if he would follow the experiment's rules. The most important one was that he was to buy all the necessary books and keep them in his possession. The next rule was that he was to attend a designated church each Sunday assigned by Jacobs. He could not smoke, drink liquor, gamble, or swear. He remained in his room every evening, except Saturday, to prepare for the next day's lessons. Other rules were that he followed a daily schedule with time allotted for classes, meals, exercise, reading in the library, studying, and sleep. He was told that the education he received would include every subject taught in the university and would take six years of study at 11 months a year. He was told that he would take twice the load of the average student and be expected to make grades of at least 90. At the end of 20 months, he was the lead student with an average grade of 95 and six, remaining in the rigid rule test project. He had received a four-year Bachelor of Arts degree. All the students that would graduate at the end of the six-year period would receive the special degree of doctor of arts and sciences.

== Oglethorpe's tomb ==
In 1922, in the churchyard of the Cranham rectory in England, Jacobs located the burial place of British General James Edward Oglethorpe, namesake of the old university. He made an effort to have his remains and those of the general's wife's moved to Atlanta where they were to be reburied in a tomb on the Oglethorpe campus, but there was opposition from Georgia organizations and English authorities that caused this to not come to fruition. Jacobs expressed a hope that the remains of Lord and Lady Oglethorpe could be moved to America in the future.

== Crypt of Civilization ==
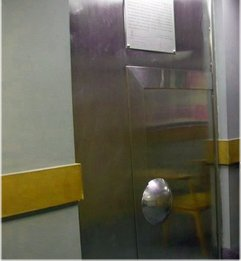
Crypt of Civilization entrance

Jacobs originated and conceived the Crypt of Civilization millennial idea for a historic time treasure trove of 1930s cultural objects sealed in a specially designed room at Oglethorpe University in 1935. The room was removed of oxygen and sealed off with welded steel doors in 1940; it was not to be opened until the 82nd century. According to the Guinness Book of World Records, it was the first record of 20th century cultural objects buried away for any future occupants of Earth or visitors that may come to the planet. He planned and designed the permanent storage space to preserve information of the early 20th century in the 1930s. He discussed this proposal in an article in Scientific American in November 1936, because he was astounded by the shortage of information on people that lived in communities and settlements that were established as a basis for nations and empires that came about later. Jacobs devised a plan to present a story of customs of humans on Earth and put it down in a detailed written design. He wanted to show the acquired knowledge of people, especially of the United States, up to the present time.

Jacobs put Dr. Thomas Kimmwood Peters in charge of the project in 1937 because of his experience as a scientist, photographer, and inventor. For the next three years most every conceivable phase of living was investigated and cataloged. There were 960,000 pages of book knowledge microfilmed by specially designed cameras of Peters' innovation. To show the level of scientific achievement, contents included 250 motion pictures about industries, processes of manufacture, surgical operations, scenes of everyday life, fiction films, documentaries, a motion picture history of the United States from 1895, and a still photography history from 1840. Additionally, to show how to live in the 20th century, fashions in 30-inch miniature models were made dressed by prominent costume designers, complete with patterns for full-length reproduction in the future. Also included was a complete five-and-ten-cent store, dishes, newspapers, chewing gum, optical instruments, musical instruments, cataloged musical recordings, scale models of railroad locomotives, automobiles, yachts, ocean liners, airplanes, air-conditioning systems, and samples of food with associated drinks.

== Death and legacy ==
Jacobs died on August 4, 1956, in Atlanta, Georgia. He is buried at the First Presbyterian Church cemetery in Clinton, South Carolina. The personal library of Jacobs of some 4000 books and numerous personal papers was given as a gift to Presbyterian College from his five children. They also established at Christmas in 1957 a memorial scholarship fund of $20,500 at the college in Clinton.

== Works ==
- Sinful Saddy Illustrated by Unknown Jolley, and by J.W. (James Willoughby) Biggers, Sr.(1907)
- The Law of the White Circle (1908)
- Midnight Mummer (poems) (1911)
- The Oglethorpe Story (1916)
- Life of William Plumer Jacobs (1918)
- The New Science and the Old Religion (1927)
- Islands of the Blest (poems) (1928)
- Oglethorpe Book of Georgia Verse (1930)
- Not Knowing Whither He Went (1933)
- Diary of William Plumber Jacobs (1937)
- Red Lanterns on St. Michael's (1940)
- Story of Christmas (1941)
- Drums of Doomsday (1942)
- Step Down, Dr. Jacobs (1945)
- When For The Truth - Reconstruction Days in South Carolina (1950)

== See also ==
- Time capsule
- Westinghouse Time Capsules
- International Time Capsule Society

== Sources ==
- Dean, Norman L. (2010). The Man Behind the Bottle. Norman L. Dean. ISBN 9781450054041.
- Marquis (1966). Who Was Who in America, Volume 3, 1951–1960. Marquis Who's Who. OCLC 894986012.
- Jarvis, William E. (2002). Time Capsules: Cultural History. McFarland. ISBN 0-7864-1261-5.
