= William Plumer Jacobs =

American minister (1842–1917)

The Reverend William Plumer Jacobs
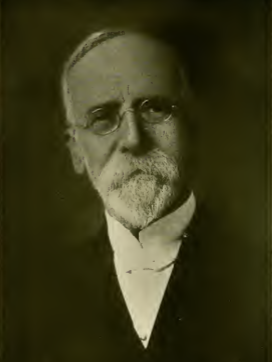
- Born: March 15, 1842; Yorkville, South Carolina, U.S.
- Died: September 10, 1917 (aged 75); Clinton, South Carolina, U.S.
- Education: College of Charleston; Columbia Theological Seminary
- Spouse: Mary Jane Dillard (m. 1865; died 1879)
- Family: Thornwell Jacobs (son); William Plumer Jacobs II (grandson)

Signature
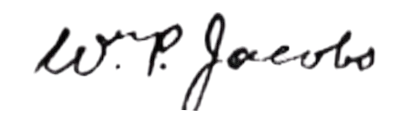

William Plumer Jacobs (/ˈpluː.mɜːr/ PLOO-mur; March 15, 1842 – September 10, 1917) was an American Presbyterian minister who founded Thornwell Orphanage and what is now Presbyterian College in Clinton, South Carolina. He was the pastor at First Presbyterian Church in Clinton for 47 years, from 1864 to 1911.

Jacobs was licensed to preach by the Charleston Presbytery in April 1863 and was made pastor of three churches in Clinton shortly following his graduation from Columbia Theological Seminary in May 1864. Within four years, he had taken on preaching at First Presbyterian Church full-time. He was a part of the Clinton Library Society and the Clinton High School Association, the latter of which founded Clinton High School in January 1873. Thornwell Orphanage opened under Jacobs's direction to ten children on October 1, 1875. Clinton High School became Clinton College in 1880 and conferred degrees starting in 1882, the first of which went to Jacobs's daughter; this school eventually became Presbyterian College. In 1909, Jacobs founded Thornwell Memorial Church on the orphanage's campus, and he ministered at both churches until retiring from First Presbyterian in September 1911. He died in September 1917. Numerous obituaries referred to him as the "Father of Clinton".

== Early life and education ==
William Plumer Jacobs was born on March 15, 1842, in Yorkville, South Carolina, to Mary Elizabeth Jacobs (née Redbrook) and Ferdinand Jacobs, a minister. He enrolled at the College of Charleston at the age of 16 and graduated with a Bachelor of Arts degree in March 1861.

Jacobs was a supporter of South Carolina's secession from the United States, and he was present when the South Carolina General Assembly voted in convention to secede in 1860. He wrote in his diary that David Flavel Jamison's declaration of South Carolina as an independent nation "was the noblest moment of my life". At the time, Jacobs had been reporting for the Carolinian on the activity of the South Carolina House of Representatives; he was moved to cover the South Carolina Senate the following year. In 1862, Jacobs was declared ineligible for conscription due to a diagnosis of amaurosis.

== Career ==
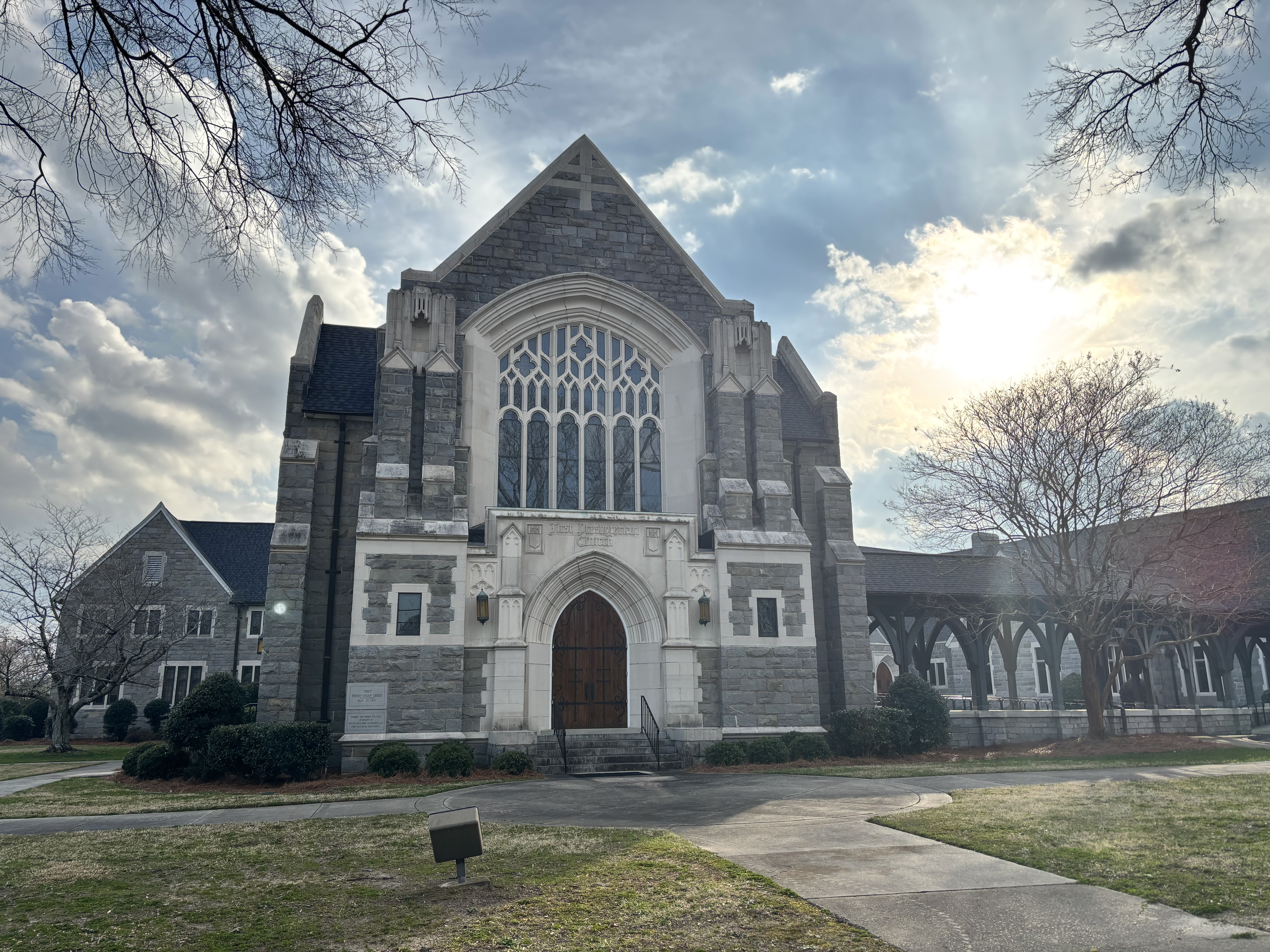
First Presbyterian Church in Clinton, where Jacobs was pastor from 1864 to 1911 (pictured in 2025)

Jacobs was licensed to preach by the Charleston Presbytery on April 3, 1863. He was ordained pastor of Clinton First Presbyterian Church, Duncan's Creek Presbyterian Church, and Shady Grove Presbyterian Church in May 1864. Around the same time, he began teaching Bible classes. He had previously preached in Clinton in July 1862, at the invitation of Zelotes L. Holmes, who helped in first organizing the Clinton First Presbyterian Church. Jacobs graduated from Columbia Theological Seminary in May 1864. Jacobs was made chairman of the Clinton Male Academy board of trustees by February 1866. He declined offers to preach in Albany, Georgia, in March 1868, and in Good Hope, Alabama, in November 1871.

The Clinton Library Society, with Jacobs as president, introduced the idea of forming a high school in Clinton at a meeting in March 1872. The Clinton High School Association was formed several months later. That same year, Jacobs began planning an orphanage, which he named Thornwell after James Henley Thornwell; Jacobs had an interest in founding an orphanage because his mother was an orphan. The plans were approved following a meeting on October 20, 1872, and Jacobs was made president. He received the first donation towards the orphanage from an orphan boy nine days later. The new Clinton High School opened on January 13, 1873, with 41 students. Jacobs periodically gave lectures over the course of the following semester, and he ceased preaching at Duncan's Creek and Shady Grove that year. Jacobs was the clerk of the South Carolina Presbytery from 1875 to 1878, and then of the Enoree Presbytery until 1897.

Jacobs attempted to create and maintain a Black church under the auspices of the Presbyterian Church in the United States (the "Southern Presbyterian Church") in addition to his existing preaching duties, but gave this up in 1874 after much of the membership had left for the Presbyterian Church in the United States of America (the "Northern Presbyterian Church"). Construction on the orphanage continued, and Thornwell Orphanage opened on October 1, 1875, housing ten children. By 1877, Thornwell had over $11,000 (equivalent to $325,000 in 2024) in assets, with nearly no debt, and Jacobs set a goal of 24 children to be housed there. By the close of 1882, Jacobs's salary from First Presbyterian Church was $800 (equivalent to $23,600 in 2024).

On September 11, 1880, Jacobs directed William States Lee, the principal of Clinton High School, to begin planning college-level classes. Shortly thereafter, Clinton High School became Clinton College, now Presbyterian College (PC). Lee was made its first president. The college received its charter on August 20, 1882, which allowed it to confer degrees. The school's first commencement was held in July 1883. Three women comprised the first graduating class, and the first degree was given to Jacobs's daughter. In 1909, Jacobs opened Thornwell Memorial Church on the orphanage's campus to alleviate the issue of limited space at First Presbyterian Church caused by the growing number of orphans.

Jacobs resigned from preaching at First Presbyterian Church in Clinton in July 1911, after 47 years. He maintained his pastorate at Thornwell Memorial until his death and even preached there on the day before his death.

== Personal life and death ==
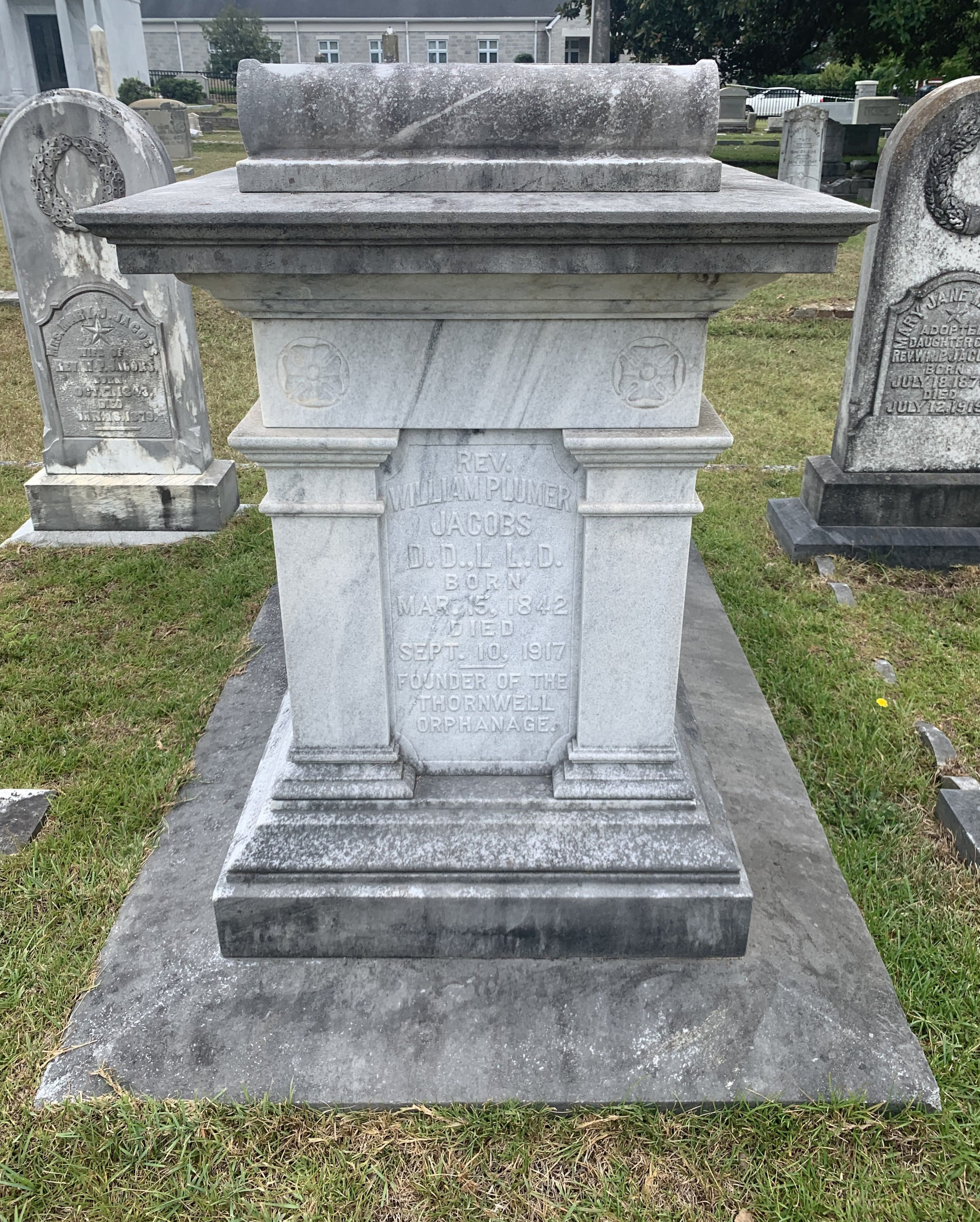
Jacobs' headstone at Clinton Cemetery

Jacobs met Mary Jane Dillard on August 18, 1864, and the pair were engaged January 26, 1865. They married on April 20, 1865, in Coldwater, South Carolina. They had seven children, five of whom survived to adulthood. Their son Thornwell Jacobs was president of Oglethorpe University from 1913 to 1941. Jacobs's grandson, William Plumer Jacobs II, was the 12th president of PC from 1935 to 1945. Mary died on January 16, 1879, after suffering illnesses periodically for the preceding year.

Jacobs was an advocate for the temperance movement, and he authored a bill in February 1878 to outlaw the sale or manufacturing of alcohol in Clinton, which passed the legislature and was signed into law. He supported Samuel J. Tilden in the 1876 United States presidential election and was a supporter of the Prohibition ticket in a local election in 1878. He was awarded the honorary Doctor of Laws degree by Erskine College in 1886 and an honorary Master of Arts degree from the College of Charleston in March 1867.

Jacobs died of a heart disease around 6:00 a.m. on September 10, 1917, at his home in Clinton. He was not sick around the time of his death and had only begun to complain of a headache that morning; he was found unconscious shortly afterward. His funeral was scheduled for September 12, with Davison McDowell Douglas, the president of PC, leading the service.

== Legacy ==
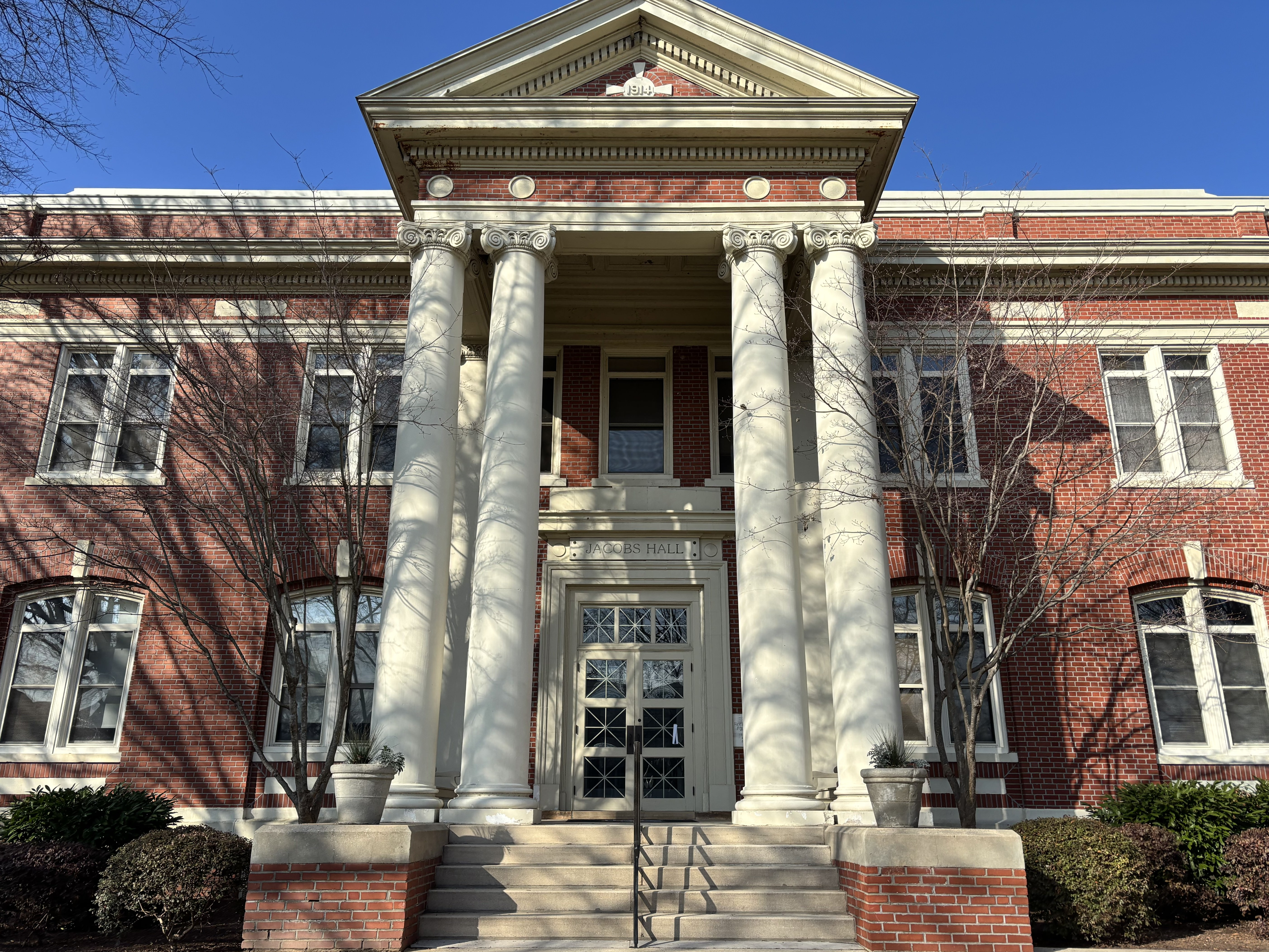
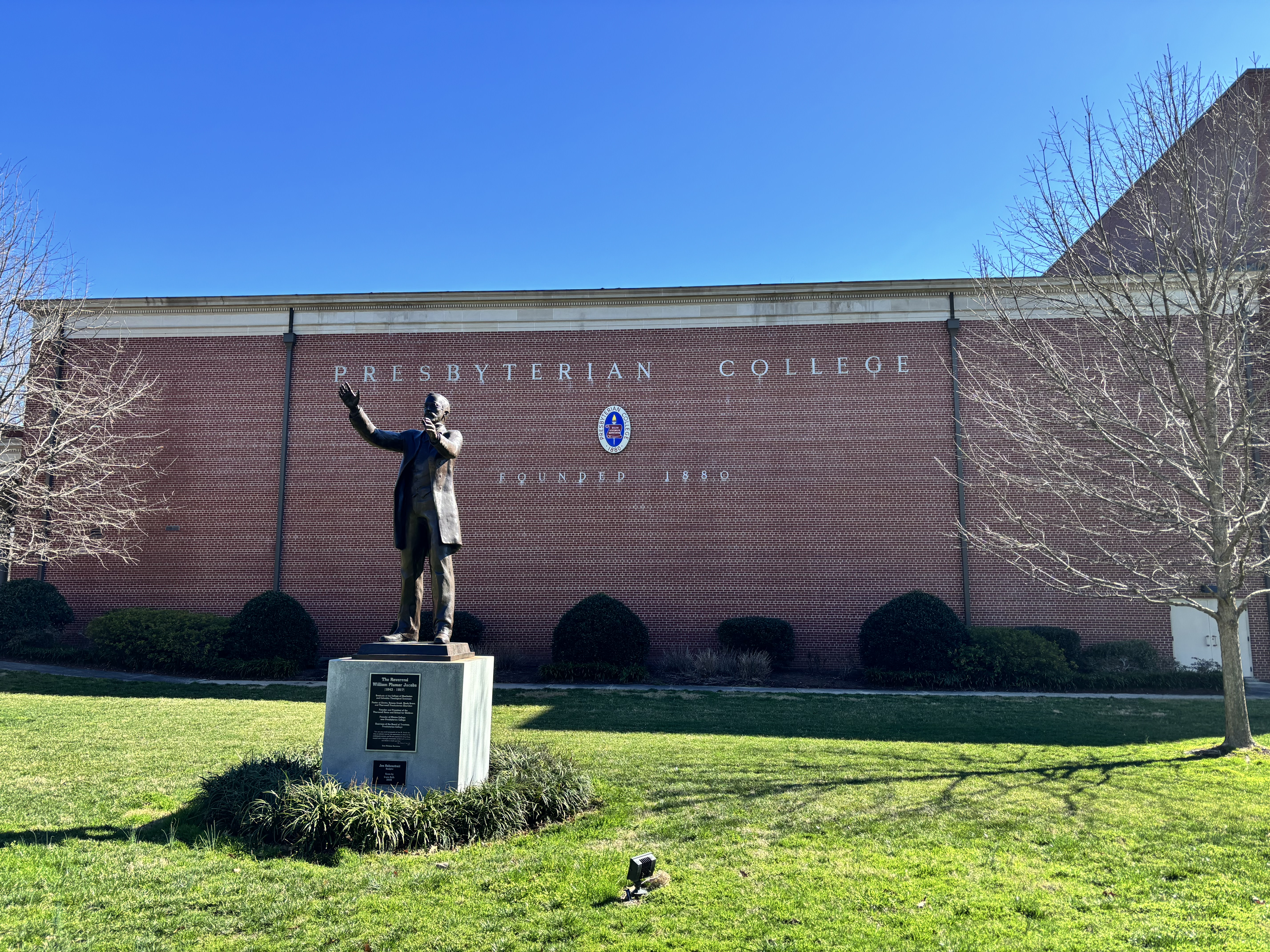
Jacobs Hall (left) and William Plumer Jacobs statue at Presbyterian College

At Presbyterian College, Jacobs Hall was constructed in 1915 and housed an auditorium, library, and laboratory space. As of 2025, the building houses the departments of business, economics, and military science. Jacobs's personal library is housed on campus at Thomason Library as the Founder's Library, which has 2,500 to 3,000 volumes.

Jacobs was referred to by many of his obituaries as the "Father of Clinton", and The Greenville News called him "one of the grand old men of South Carolina".
