= Lynching of Norris Dendy =

1933 lynching in South Carolina, U.S.

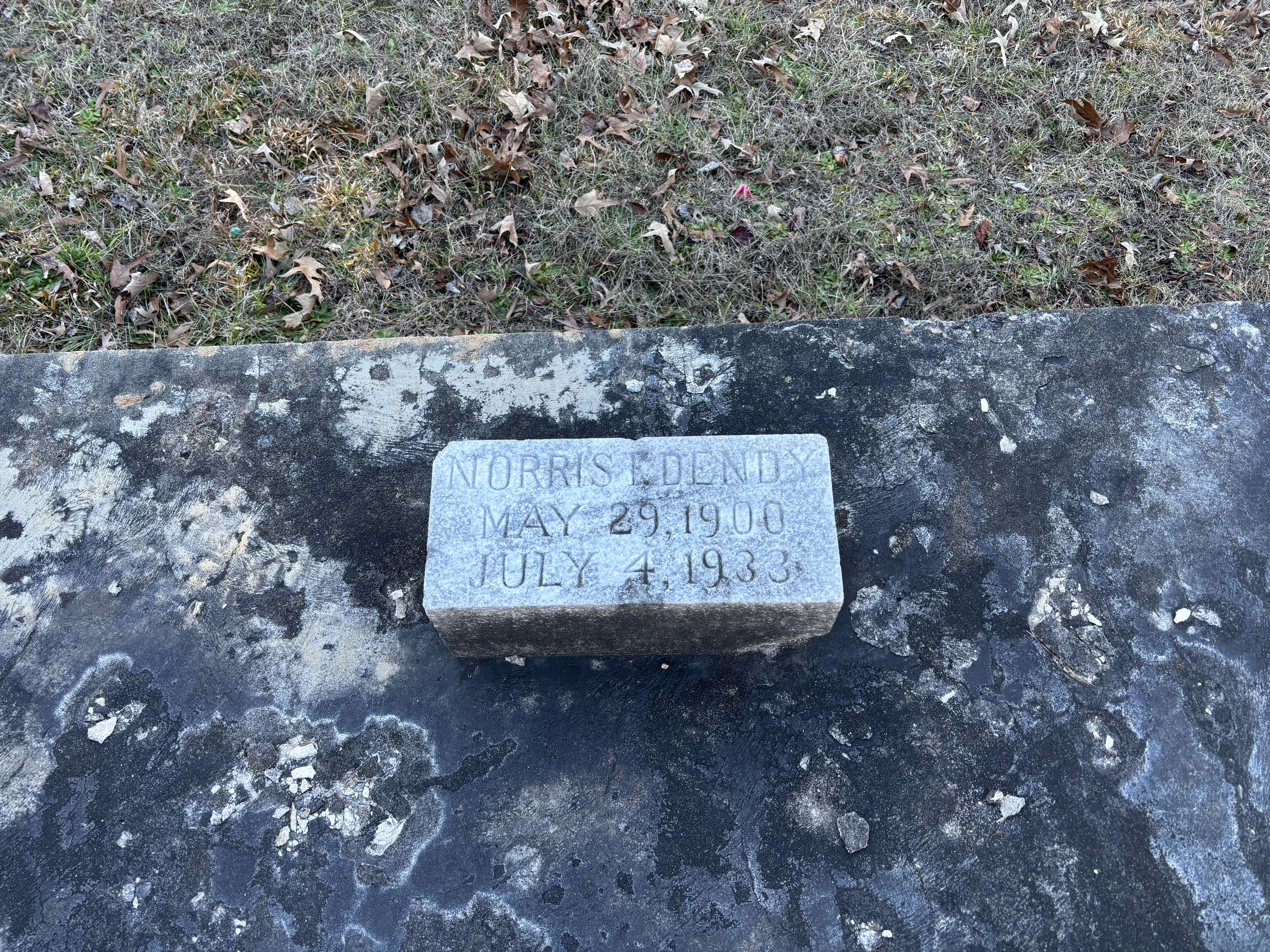
Dendy's grave at the Friendship AME Church Cemetery in Clinton, South Carolina

Norris Dendy (May 1900 – July 4 or 5, 1933) was an African-American man who was taken from his jail cell and lynched by a group of white men in Clinton, South Carolina. The son of Martha and Young Dendy, Norris was college-educated and married with five children at the time of his murder.

While driving a truck transporting picnickers to an Independence Day celebration on Lake Murray, Dendy became involved in an argument with 22-year-old Marvin Lollis, a white man also working as a truck driver, which turned physical when Dendy struck Lollis in the face. He was arrested and placed in jail in Clinton, though he was given little protection because the offense was not considered very serious. Later that night, Dendy was broken out of jail by a group of four white men who were there as part of a larger mob numbering at least one hundred. The men put Dendy into their automobile and later beat and hanged him, causing a fracture near the base of his skull that ultimately killed him. They then transported his body to a churchyard near present-day South Carolina Highway 72, about seven miles outside of Clinton, where it was found the next day by sheriff's deputies.

Five men were charged with the killing, but a July 1934 grand jury failed to indict any of them despite urgings from the NAACP. Dendy's family was denied a $2,000 claim that was ordinarily provided to the families of lynching victims. Suspected motives have included a beating that was not supposed to be fatal and a premeditated killing owing to Dendy's family's financial status compared to some poor whites living around them.

== Background ==
Norris Dendy was born in May 1900 (Note: Many sources, both contemporary and modern, list Dendy as having been 35 years old at the time of his death, though he was actually 33 years old as can be seen from the 1900 U.S. census listing which shows him as having been born May 1900.) and was one of nine children of Martha (née Duckett) and Earl Young Dendy. Both of Norris's parents were the children of freed slaves; Martha was born near present-day Joanna, South Carolina, in 1867, and Earl, who went just by the name "Young", was also born in Laurens County. Young was a carpenter at the time of their marriage, and Martha ran a laundry business, largely providing service to nearby Presbyterian College. Martha Dendy School in Clinton was later named for her. Norris attended State College (now South Carolina State University) and Virginia Union University and married Amanda Faut, a black woman aged 19, on January 5, 1924. As listed on the 1930 U.S. census, Dendy was working as a laborer in a lumber yard and had three children with Amanda; the couple had five children at the time of his death.

In 1929, Dendy was arrested and brought to trial on five counts of buying and receiving sacks of soda and guano which later turned out to be stolen. In their December 1933 edition, The Crisis claimed that he was framed for the crime. The Laurens County Magistrate's Court convicted him, but this conviction was appealed to the Laurens County Court of General Sessions, which upheld it. Dendy then appealed to the South Carolina Supreme Court. His case was heard by the Supreme Court on October 1, 1930, where the conviction was reversed. The opinion, written by Justice Jesse F. Carter, held that there was no allegation that Dendy knew the goods were stolen, meaning he could not be convicted.

Dendy and his family had been threatened before. In 1924, Young, working as a carpenter and a contractor, built a house outside the part of town where most of the black population lived and received a threatening anonymous letter in response. The letter instructed him to "stay in his place" and threatened Norris's life by saying "that dam [sic] manish boy of yours will die soon".

== Arrest, capture and lynching ==
On the afternoon of July 4, Dendy was involved in an altercation near Lake Murray with a white 22-year-old truck driver named Marvin Lollis. Both Dendy and Lollis had been driving picnickers to the lake as part of Independence Day celebrations. They got into an argument—about the "merits of their respective trucks", according to a report by the Commission on Interracial Cooperation—and Dendy struck Lollis in the face, allegedly in response to being called a racial slur, before leaving. Dendy was arrested a short time later after being pulled over for drunkenness, reckless driving, and resisting arrest, and was placed in the jail at Clinton, South Carolina. Because he was not charged with any capital crime, he was provided limited protection in jail.

At some point that evening, (Note: Sources vary on the time Dendy was broken out; Baker (2000) said it was around 9:00 p.m. on July 4, but the Greenville News said it was shortly after midnight on July 5. Dendy's headstone gives his date of death as July 4.) four white men entered the jail and gained access to Dendy by using a wrench to remove his cell's lock. They forced Dendy to get into their car and left the jail before any alarm was triggered or any authorities were contacted. The jail did not have a jailor; the employee eyewitness to Dendy's capture was the janitor who was working at the time. About a hundred people were present outside the jail when the capture took place, including multiple Clinton police officers. An article published in The Crisis in May 1934 noted that it was "a matter of common knowledge" that most of the police force had taken part, and testimony during a 1934 Senate subcommittee hearing claimed that several police officers opened the jail to allow Dendy to be removed. The breakout happened shortly after Dendy's wife, Amanda, went to the jail in an unsuccessful attempt to bail him out. Dendy's mother and children, who accompanied her, were fired upon by the mob with a pistol. Dendy's mother was struck. The men beat Dendy before hanging him; after he was dead, they moved his body to a different location, the yard of Sardis Church seven miles away along present-day South Carolina Highway 72, where it was found about twelve hours later by members of the Laurens County Sherriff's Office (LCSO). The LCSO had begun a search just before 1:00 p.m. on July 5 in an attempt to find Dendy and the men who broke him out of jail. Those that found Dendy's body initially identified it as having suffered gunshot wounds, though the Clinton chief of police said that was not the case. This misconception spread to some reports in spite of this and even appeared in the NAACP's 1933 lynching record. The rope used to hang Dendy was found still around his neck. (Note: One source, the Gaffney Ledger, explicitly disagrees with this fact, saying "Sheriff C. L. Owens said there was no rope around the negro's neck when the body was found.")

An examination of Dendy's body concluded that his death was caused by a fracture at the base of his skull, and that his body was bruised on the head, neck, and chin. His wrists and ankles showed signs of having been tightly bound by rope. Later reports said that the mob had not planned to kill Dendy but did so after he fought back during their attack, though The State, in an article advocating for the prosecution of the men involved, alleged that the attack was entirely premeditated. An April 1935 article in the Pittsburgh Courier posited that the motive was jealousy of the Dendy family's "financial independence" and that the altercation with Lollis was merely a "spark". This was not unheard of, as it had been recorded before that a lynching was the result, in part, of a black family's financial comfort and reluctance to view themselves as subservient to the poorer whites around them.

== Investigation and legal proceedings ==
State Solicitor Homer S. Blackwell announced on July 5 that the start of an investigation would be postponed for around a week to allow evidence to be gathered. Governor Ibra Charles Blackwood declared Dendy's death a murder, rather than a lynching, and sent two state constables to begin an investigation immediately. The constables left Clinton to return to Columbia on July 11 without having made any arrests. The attack was the first lynching in South Carolina since Henry Campbell in November 1932, according to the NAACP, though the lynching of Dan Jenkins in June 1930 was the last in South Carolina to be "officially recorded", according to the Greenville News. Dendy was one of three black men lynched in South Carolina that year and was also the victim of Laurens County's last reported lynching.

Numerous black witnesses to Dendy's kidnapping from jail were threatened into silence or intimidated into not testifying by citizens or police, to the point that some left the state entirely. Some ignored subpoenas and repeatedly declined requests to testify. William Crawford, one of the eyewitnesses to Dendy's breakout, gave a deposition in Washington, D.C., in January 1934 after numerous threats of violence if he were to testify. He and others gave testimony to a jury on February 17, 1934, as to the identities of several men involved, leading the NAACP to send a telegram to Governor Blackwood in late May 1934 urging him to convict the lynchers, who were "positively identified", according to an excerpt of the telegram published in the Omaha Guide. In addition, the attack prompted the relocation of the Piedmont Annual Conference of the African Methodist Episcopal Church, which was scheduled to be held in Clinton on November 29.

Five white men were named in an indictment for Dendy's death on February 19, 1934, listed in the Macon Telegraph as Hubert Pitts, P. M. Pitts, Roy Pitts, J. Pitts Ray, and Marvin Lollis. The Laurens County grand jury deliberated for about two hours on that day without reaching a decision, but said that it would use the testimony and affidavits in considering the case during their meeting in June of that year. During that June meeting, the grand jury failed to indict any of the men, instead returning no bill and opining that Dendy's death was due to the actions of an unknown party, in spite of the fact that one of the lynchers reportedly confessed to the crime in writing to state detectives. In December 1934, Young Dendy filed a $2,000 claim (equivalent to $48,000 in 2025) with the Laurens County board of commissioners for Norris's death, as was standard in state law for recovery from a "proved case" of a lynching, according to The Greenville News. This claim was rejected on the recommendation of the county attorney, R. E. Babb, perhaps owing to Blackwood's insistence that Dendy's death was the result of a murder, not a lynching. The case took place in the midst of debate at the national level about the Costigan–Wagner Bill, which died before making it to a vote.

The NAACP announced plans to reopen the case in April 1935 after work was done to that effect by Norris's brother Robert Dendy. Robert's attorney had hired an investigator who went to Clinton in September 1933 after the constables' departure, and Robert later brought witnesses to New York to allow them to testify safely.
