= Bronze Derby =

American college football rivalry game

- Teams: Presbyterian Blue Hose; Newberry Wolves
- First meeting: October 29, 1913; Newberry, 51–0
- Latest meeting: November 11, 2006; Presbyterian, 10–0

Statistics
- Total meetings: 93
- All-time series: Presbyterian leads, 57–33–5
- Largest victory: Presbyterian, 54–0 (1929)
- Longest win streak: Presbyterian, 6 (1998–2003)
- Current win streak: Presbyterian, 2 (2005–2006)

Locations of Newberry and Presbyterian

The Bronze Derby rivalry was an American college football rivalry game played between Presbyterian College and Newberry College. The teams first met in 1913, when they played two games in a row against each other on October 29 and November 7. Newberry won both of these meetings 51–0. Presbyterian and Newberry played each other every year from 1913 to 2006 (with the exception of 1914 and 1918), when Presbyterian left the SAC to join the Big South.

== Game results ==
| Presbyterian victories | Newberry victories | Tie games |

| No. | Date | Location | Winner | Score |
|---|---|---|---|---|
| 1 | October 29, 1913 | Newberry, SC | Newberry | 51–0 |
| 2 | November 7, 1913 | Newberry, SC | Newberry | 51–0 |
| 3 | November 25, 1915 | Clinton, SC | Newberry | 20–13 |
| 4 | November 30, 1916 | Newberry, SC | Presbyterian | 3–0 |
| 5 | November 29, 1917 | Clinton, SC | Presbyterian | 20–0 |
| 6 | November 27, 1919 | Newberry, SC | Tie | 0–0 |
| 7 | November 25, 1920 | Clinton, SC | Presbyterian | 27–0 |
| 8 | November 24, 1921 | Newberry, SC | Newberry | 15–7 |
| 9 | November 30, 1922 | Clinton, SC | Presbyterian | 35–9 |
| 10 | November 29, 1923 | Newberry, SC | Presbyterian | 7–0 |
| 11 | October 24, 1924 | Clinton, SC | Newberry | 10–0 |
| 12 | October 23, 1925 | Newberry, SC | Newberry | 22–6 |
| 13 | November 11, 1926 | Clinton, SC | Presbyterian | 28–0 |
| 14 | November 11, 1927 | Newberry, SC | Presbyterian | 12–0 |
| 15 | October 25, 1928 | Clinton, SC | Newberry | 12–6 |
| 16 | November 28, 1929 | Clinton, SC | Presbyterian | 54–0 |
| 17 | November 27, 1930 | Newberry, SC | Presbyterian | 31–0 |
| 18 | October 31, 1931 | Clinton, SC | Presbyterian | 6–0 |
| 19 | November 4, 1932 | Newberry, SC | Tie | 7–7 |
| 20 | November 11, 1933 | Clinton, SC | Newberry | 16–7 |
| 21 | November 9, 1934 | Newberry, SC | Presbyterian | 13–0 |
| 22 | October 12, 1935 | Clinton, SC | Presbyterian | 20–0 |
| 23 | October 23, 1936 | Newberry, SC | Presbyterian | 27–0 |
| 24 | October 15, 1937 | Clinton, SC | Newberry | 13–0 |
| 25 | October 14, 1938 | Clinton, SC | Presbyterian | 7–6 |
| 26 | October 13, 1939 | Clinton, SC | Presbyterian | 6–0 |
| 27 | October 11, 1940 | Newberry, SC | Newberry | 20–7 |
| 28 | October 17, 1941 | Clinton, SC | Presbyterian | 13–7 |
| 29 | October 9, 1942 | Newberry, SC | Presbyterian | 14–7 |
| 30 | October 2, 1943 | Clinton, SC | Presbyterian | 13–12 |
| 31 | October 14, 1944 | Clinton, SC | Presbyterian | 20–6 |
| 32 | November 30, 1945 | Clinton, SC | Newberry | 19–13 |
| 33 | November 28, 1946 | Clinton, SC | Presbyterian | 14–13 |
| 34 | November 27, 1947 | Newberry, SC | Newberry | 6–0 |
| 35 | November 25, 1948 | Clinton, SC | Presbyterian | 40–7 |
| 36 | November 19, 1949 | Newberry, SC | Newberry | 20–14 |
| 37 | November 23, 1950 | Clinton, SC | Presbyterian | 20–6 |
| 38 | November 22, 1951 | Newberry, SC | Presbyterian | 27–0 |
| 39 | November 22, 1952 | Clinton, SC | Presbyterian | 14–12 |
| 40 | November 26, 1953 | Newberry, SC | Tie | 7–7 |
| 41 | November 25, 1954 | Clinton, SC | Presbyterian | 20–18 |
| 42 | November 24, 1955 | Newberry, SC | Newberry | 20–18 |
| 43 | November 22, 1956 | Clinton, SC | Newberry | 13–0 |
| 44 | November 28, 1957 | Newberry, SC | Newberry | 13–0 |
| 45 | November 26, 1958 | Clinton, SC | Presbyterian | 22–0 |
| 46 | November 26, 1959 | Newberry, SC | #16 Presbyterian | 20–6 |
| 47 | November 24, 1960 | Clinton, SC | Presbyterian | 7–6 |

| No. | Date | Location | Winner | Score |
|---|---|---|---|---|
| 48 | November 23, 1961 | Newberry, SC | Tie | 7–7 |
| 49 | November 23, 1962 | Newberry, SC | Newberry | 23–0 |
| 50 | November 28, 1963 | Newberry, SC | Presbyterian | 14–7 |
| 51 | November 26, 1964 | Clinton, SC | Presbyterian | 35–6 |
| 52 | November 25, 1965 | Newberry, SC | Newberry | 6–0 |
| 53 | November 24, 1966 | Clinton, SC | Presbyterian | 28–7 |
| 54 | November 23, 1967 | Newberry, SC | Presbyterian | 14–0 |
| 55 | November 28, 1968 | Clinton, SC | Presbyterian | 42–7 |
| 56 | November 27, 1969 | Newberry, SC | Presbyterian | 23–21 |
| 57 | November 26, 1970 | Newberry, SC | Presbyterian | 27–23 |
| 58 | November 25, 1971 | Newberry, SC | Newberry | 34–0 |
| 59 | November 23, 1972 | Clinton, SC | Presbyterian | 17–0 |
| 60 | November 22, 1973 | Newberry, SC | Newberry | 14–3 |
| 61 | November 28, 1974 | Clinton, SC | Presbyterian | 37–7 |
| 62 | November 27, 1975 | Newberry, SC | Presbyterian | 14–0 |
| 63 | November 25, 1976 | Clinton, SC | Newberry | 26–15 |
| 64 | November 24, 1977 | Newberry, SC | Presbyterian | 3–0 |
| 65 | November 23, 1978 | Clinton, SC | Presbyterian | 26–0 |
| 66 | November 22, 1979 | Newberry, SC | Presbyterian | 16–14 |
| 67 | November 27, 1980 | Clinton, SC | Newberry | 28–20 |
| 68 | November 26, 1981 | Newberry, SC | Newberry | 26–23 |
| 69 | November 25, 1982 | Clinton, SC | Presbyterian | 21–7 |
| 70 | November 24, 1983 | Newberry, SC | Newberry | 23–0 |
| 71 | November 22, 1984 | Clinton, SC | Newberry | 25–16 |
| 72 | November 28, 1985 | Newberry, SC | Tie | 24–24 |
| 73 | November 27, 1986 | Clinton, SC | Presbyterian | 35–20 |
| 74 | November 20, 1987 | Newberry, SC | Newberry | 17–15 |
| 75 | November 24, 1988 | Clinton, SC | Presbyterian | 30–16 |
| 76 | November 23, 1989 | Newberry, SC | Newberry | 29–24 |
| 77 | November 22, 1990 | Clinton, SC | Newberry | 24–7 |
| 78 | November 28, 1991 | Newberry, SC | Presbyterian | 32–17 |
| 79 | November 26, 1992 | Clinton, SC | Newberry | 14–0 |
| 80 | September 18, 1993 | Newberry, SC | Presbyterian | 30–13 |
| 81 | November 12, 1994 | Clinton, SC | Presbyterian | 24–13 |
| 82 | November 11, 1995 | Newberry, SC | Newberry | 9–8 |
| 83 | November 16, 1996 | Clinton, SC | Newberry | 21–10 |
| 84 | November 15, 1997 | Newberry, SC | Newberry | 28–22 |
| 85 | November 14, 1998 | Clinton, SC | Presbyterian | 45–14 |
| 86 | November 13, 1999 | Newberry, SC | Presbyterian | 45–35 |
| 87 | November 11, 2000 | Clinton, SC | Presbyterian | 34–27 |
| 88 | November 10, 2001 | Newberry, SC | Presbyterian | 31–24 |
| 89 | November 16, 2002 | Clinton, SC | Presbyterian | 14–10 |
| 90 | November 15, 2003 | Newberry, SC | Presbyterian | 42–14 |
| 91 | November 6, 2004 | Clinton, SC | Newberry | 28–25 |
| 92 | November 5, 2005 | Newberry, SC | #5 Presbyterian | 38–7 |
| 93 | November 11, 2006 | Clinton, SC | Presbyterian | 10–0 |
Series: Presbyterian leads 55–33–5

== See also ==
- List of NCAA college football rivalry games
