= Lil McClintock =

American singer-songwriter

- The only known photo of McClintock

Background information
- Born: June 5, 1883; Clinton, South Carolina, U.S.
- Died: 1930s or 1940 probably Union County, South Carolina, U.S.
- Genres: Country Blues
- Occupations: Songster; Musician
- Instruments: Vocal; Guitar

Lil McClintock (June 5, 1883 – 1930s or 1940) was an American country blues songster who accompanied himself on acoustic guitar. Not much is known about McClintock's personal life, before or after he recorded four sides for Columbia Records. Interest in his recordings has been revived over the years, and they are prized by collectors.

McClintock worked as a street performer in Clinton, South Carolina, before he was tasked by a manager of Cooper's Furniture Store, Burm Lessie, with accompanying another local musician, Blind Gussie Nesbitt, to record for Columbia Records. Unbeknownst to Lessie, he first encountered McClintock in 1923 when he wrote a ballad about Delia Holmes, an individual who gained some media attention for being murdered in a casino in Georgia. McClintock was commonly referred to as "Lil"; it has been speculated that this was either an abbreviation of little or a reference to his tall, thin figure.

After traveling by train, McClintock recorded two gospel numbers and two "coon songs" on December 4, 1930. The latter two compositions are in a musical subgenre that is seldom republished, because of its blatantly racist representations of black people. First among the pair was "Don't Think I'm Santa Claus", which has a refrain derived from minstrel shows and a rudimentary banjo-inspired accompaniment. Another song, "Furniture Man", played in a similar style, refers to black people as coons and advertises Cooper's Furniture Store in the process. In keeping with the minstrel-influenced qualities, McClintock addresses himself as "Mr. Brown" throughout the song. Both McClintock's and Nesbitt's recordings were issued in pressings of 750 copies in June 1931; McClintock fared better, as all four of his sides were released.

Following the recording session, McClintock completely disappeared from any documentation. His records have become some of the rarest and sought after items among collectors, with any surviving issues being in pristine condition. In 1986, all of his recordings were issued on the compilation album Atlanta Blues 1927–30: The Complete Recordings in Chronological Order of Julius Daniels and Lil McClintock, which includes McClintock's material with that of the guitarist Julius Daniels.
