= Douglas Kiker =

American journalist

Ralph Douglas Kiker, Jr. (January 7, 1930 – August 14, 1991) was an American author and newspaper and television reporter whose career spanned three decades.

Kiker was born in Griffin, Georgia. He graduated from Presbyterian College in 1952. He served with the United States Navy during the Korean War, joining its Officer Candidate School before being assigned as a gunnery officer. After his discharge as a Navy Lieutenant, he was the Washington correspondent with The Atlanta Journal from the mid-1950s to 1962. He first gained national attention for his book "The Southerner," published in 1957 and followed by "Strangers on the Shore". He became director of public information with the Peace Corps, serving from 1962 until 1963. He left the government and became the White House correspondent with the New York Herald Tribune from 1963 until the newspaper ceased publication in 1966. In his first week on the job he rode in the press bus in the motorcade of President John F. Kennedy when Kennedy was assassinated in Dallas, Texas. By 1966, NBC News had taken notice of his varied background and hired him as a correspondent. He would remain with that network for the rest of his life.

Kiker became distinguished for his numerous assignments over the years for NBC. Perhaps his best-known work was covering military conflicts in Southeast Asia (namely Vietnam) and the Mideast (particularly the Iranian Revolution); during much of that time, he served as NBC's Rome bureau chief, with a territory encompassing most of Europe and western Asia. He received the Peabody Award in 1970 for his coverage of the Black September in Jordan conflict.

But Kiker also excelled at domestic stories, as well, including the civil rights movement and U.S. politics. He reported from Walter Reed Army Medical Center on the 1969 death of President Dwight Eisenhower. He was also the commentator on the August 9, 1974 live broadcast of President Richard Nixon's departure from office in disgrace from the Watergate scandal. Kiker filed reports for David Brinkley's documentaries and short-lived newsmagazines during the 1970s, in addition to his regular work on NBC Nightly News, where he occasionally anchored on the weekends. Kiker worked as a floor reporter during NBC's coverage of the 1972 political conventions and was Washington editor for Today in the mid- to late 1970s. His colleague John Chancellor described Kiker as 'stubborn as a mule and smart as a whip.'

In the early 1980s, Kiker did a report critical of radio personality Howard Stern, just as Stern was leaving a Washington D.C. station to join WNBC-AM in New York.

Despite the success of his 1950s novels, Kiker did not return to book length fiction until later in his life, when he wrote three mystery novels, "Murder on Clam Pond" (published in 1986), "Death at the Cut" (1988), and "Death Below Deck" (1991). The mysteries were set on Cape Cod and featured reporter Mac McFarland. They received considerable critical acclaim.

At the time of his death, Kiker had a wife, one daughter, and four sons. According to obituaries in The New York Times and other major newspapers, Douglas Kiker died in his sleep, apparently from a heart attack, while vacationing at his Cape Cod summer home in Chatham, Massachusetts at age 61.
