= Jimmie Turner =

American football player (born 1962)

No. 57
- Position: Linebacker

Personal information
- Born: February 16, 1962 (age 64); Vienna, Georgia, U.S.
- Listed height: 6 ft 2 in (1.88 m)
- Listed weight: 220 lb (100 kg)

Career information
- High school: Vienna
- College: Presbyterian
- NFL draft: 1984: undrafted

Career history
- Dallas Cowboys (1984)

Awards and highlights
- 3× All-SAC 8 (1981, 1982, 1983); NAIA All-American (1983); Little All-American (1983)

Career NFL statistics
- Games played: 5
- Stats at Pro Football Reference

James Turner (born February 16, 1962) is an American former professional football player who was a linebacker in the National Football League (NFL) for the Dallas Cowboys. He played college football for the Presbyterian Blue Hose.

== Early life ==
Turner attended Vienna High School in Georgia, where he practiced football, basketball and track.

He accepted a football scholarship from Presbyterian College. He was a three-year starter at defensive end, before being moved to outside linebacker as a senior. He also practiced track.

== Professional career ==
Turner was signed as an undrafted free agent by the Dallas Cowboys after the 1984 NFL draft. He was waived on August 27. On November 14, he was re-signed after the team released wide receiver Harold Carmichael, to provide depth at the linebacker position. He only played on special teams and was cut on August 19, 1985.

== Personal life ==
He is the founder of Turner Financial Group.
