= Ernest Shahid =

Ernest Shahid (August 12, 1921 – December 31, 2008), a pioneering Florida commercial real estate developer, helped transform Destin and coastal Okaloosa County into a major tourist vacation destination. Shahid built the first major highrise condominium complex on the Emerald Coast in 1971. Its success sparked a flurry of resort complexes and economic development.

== Early life ==
Ernest Wadere Shahid was born in South Carolina into a family of Lebanese immigrants. He spent his childhood in Timmonsville before leaving to attend Presbyterian College where he played on the football team. Shahid married Margaret Pharo of Birmingham, Alabama, in 1942 and served in the Army Air Corps between 1943 and 1945. Following his military service the Shahids moved to Birmingham where Ernest worked at his father-in-law's five-and-dime store. There he had three children, Ernest Jr, Wayne, and Cary and three more once he relocated to Destin; Mark and the twins (Lisa and Lynda).

== Career ==
Shahid began his career as a builder when the contractor he hired to construct his home quit. Shahid hired the construction crew, completing the home under budget. From there he went on to build homes throughout Birmingham from 1946 to 1952.

Moving to Florida in 1952, Shahid purchased the Riviera Hotel in Destin and built the Shoreline Hotel in 1955.

It was in 1971-72 that Shahid made his most significant contribution to Destin by building the town's first highrise condominium, the Shoreline Towers. At the time there were no other major condominium complexes or resorts in Walton or Okaloosa counties. The construction of the Shoreline Towers heralded the beginning of Destin's transformation from a sleepy fishing village into one of the most significant holiday locations on the Florida panhandle.

Shahid went on to develop other major coastal projects in Destin, including Shoreline Towers West in 1978 (renamed The Tides) and Regency Towers in 1982. He has been called "the man who...has done more to change the face of Destin", in part because Shoreline Towers "brough a world of money into Okaloosa County."
