= Clinton Commercial Historic District (Clinton, South Carolina) =

Historic district in South Carolina, United States

- U.S. National Register of Historic Places
- U.S. Historic district
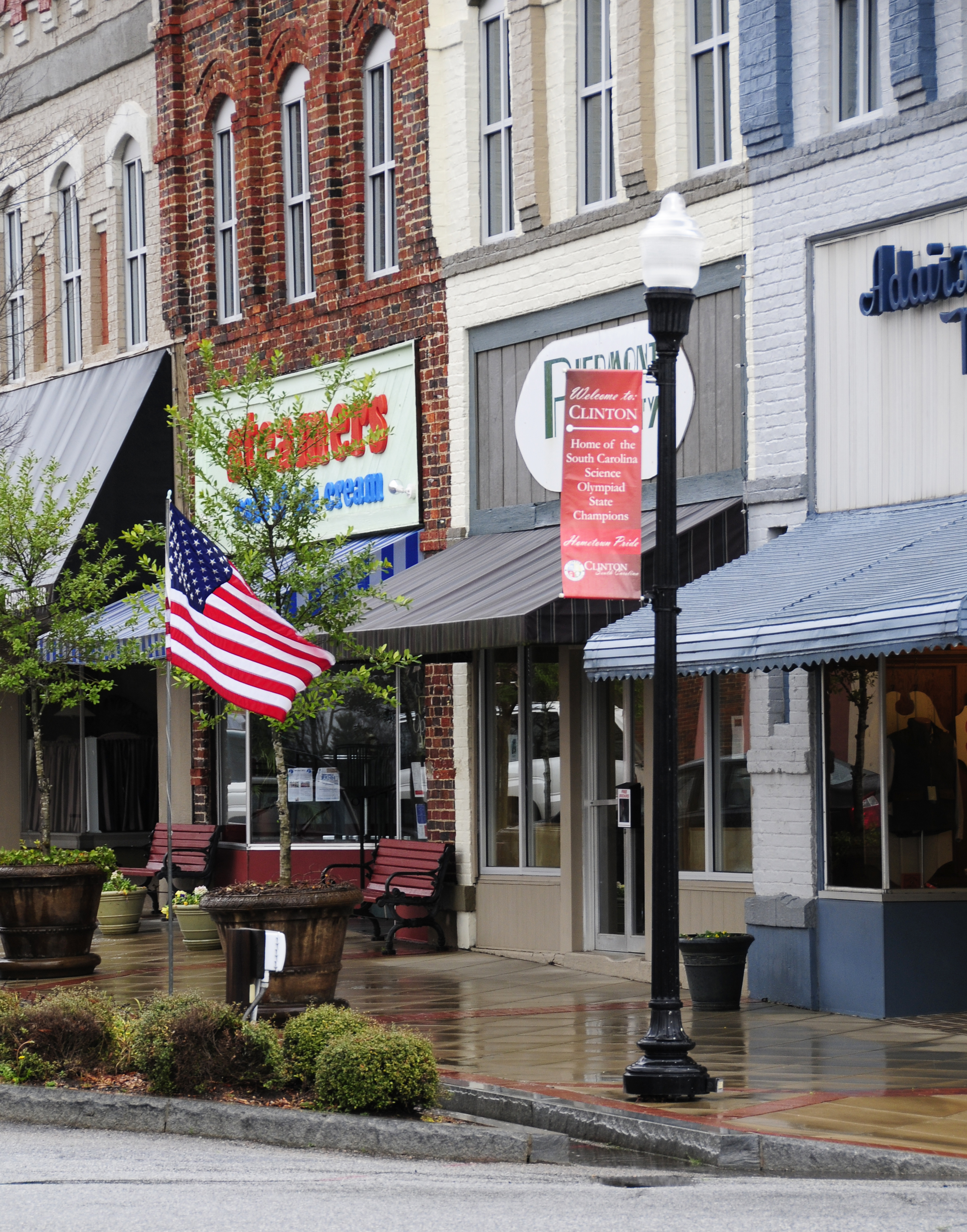

- Location within South Carolina Location within the United States
- Location: Main, Broad, Pitts, Musgrove and Gary Sts., Clinton, South Carolina
- Coordinates: 34°28′23″N 81°52′52″W
- Built: 1875
- Architect: Tribble, D.E. & Co.; Et al.
- Architectural style: Moderne
- NRHP reference No.: 84000577 (original); 100005072 (increase)

Significant dates
- Added to NRHP: November 15, 1984
- Boundary increase: March 16, 2020

Clinton Commercial Historic District is a national historic district located at Clinton, Laurens County, South Carolina. It encompasses 37 contributing buildings in the central business district of Clinton. The district predominantly comprises late-19th and early-20th century commercial buildings, and also contains two bank buildings; a five-section warehouse; a former city hall; a large, industrial building; a Masonic temple; and a small, landscaped park.

It was listed on the National Register of Historic Places in 1984.
