= Duncan's Creek Presbyterian Church =

Historic church in South Carolina, United States

- U.S. National Register of Historic Places
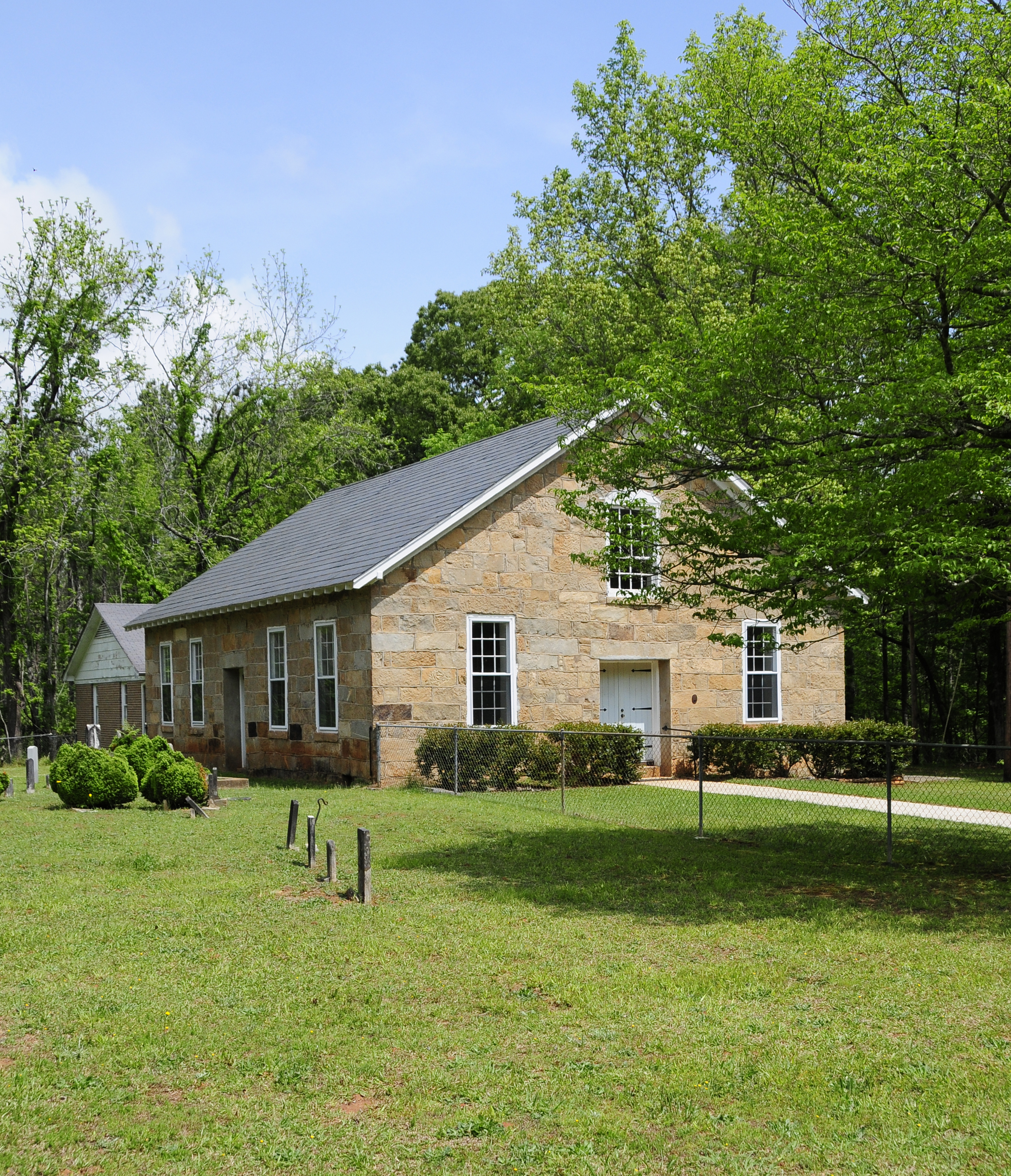

- Location within South Carolina Location within the United States
- Location: 5 miles northeast of Clinton, off South Carolina Highway 72, near Clinton, South Carolina
- Coordinates: 34°31′18″N 81°48′29″W
- Area: 3.8 acres (1.5 ha)
- Built: 1842
- NRHP reference No.: 73001714
- Added to NRHP: November 15, 1973

Duncan Creek Presbyterian Church, also known as Old Rock Church, is a historic Presbyterian church located near Clinton, Laurens County, South Carolina. It was built in 1842 and is a simple rectangular building constructed of irregular stones. The church was founded by Scotch-Irish and Irish settlers and believed to be the oldest church in Laurens County.

It was added to the National Register of Historic Places in 1973.

Members of this congregation were ardent Patriots in the American Revolutionary War. Many of these people are buried in the adjacent cemetery.
