= Thornwell–Presbyterian College Historic District =

Historic district in South Carolina, United States

- U.S. National Register of Historic Places
- U.S. Historic district
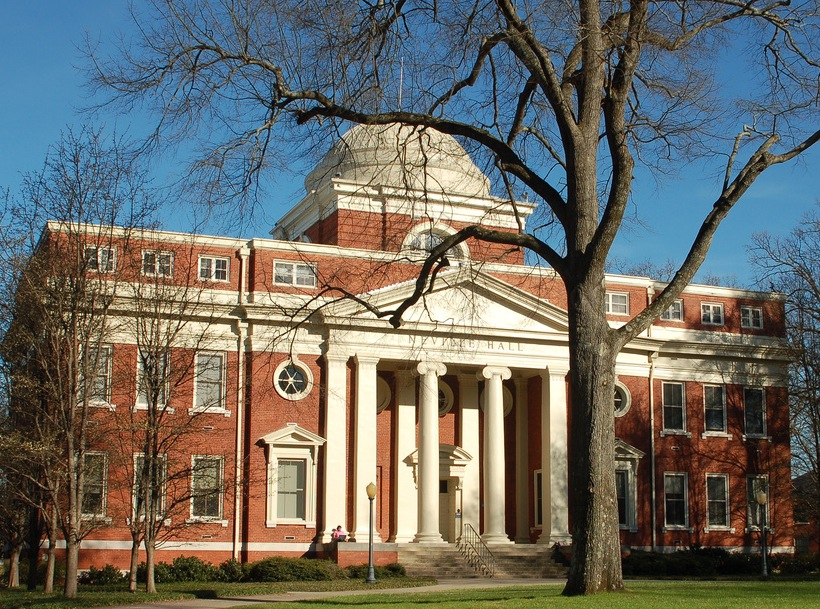
- Neville Hall, built in 1907

- Location within South Carolina Location within the United States
- Location: Presbyterian College campus, Clinton, South Carolina
- Coordinates: 34.466111°N 81.88°W
- Area: 52 acres (21 ha)
- Built: 1875
- Architects: Charles Wellford Leavitt, Charles Coker Wilson
- Architectural style: Colonial Revival, Georgian Revival
- NRHP reference No.: 82003873
- Added to NRHP: March 5, 1982

Thornwell–Presbyterian College Historic District is a historic district on the Presbyterian College campus in Clinton, Laurens County, South Carolina. The majority of the 52 buildings in the district were constructed in the early 1900s, around plans by landscape architect Charles Wellford Leavitt.

Thornwell Orphanage is in the area.

The district was listed on the National Register of Historic Places in 1982.
