= Thornwell Orphanage =

Coordinates: 34°28′09″N 81°52′53″W

Thornwell, formerly Thornwell Orphanage, is an institution supporting children in difficult situations. It opened in Clinton, South Carolina on October 1, 1875, to ten orphaned children. It was founded by Reverend William Plumer Jacobs and named for noted theologian James Henley Thornwell. Dr. Jacobs went on to found Presbyterian College and his son Thornwell Jacobs revitalized Oglethorpe University. It has programs in several states.

Thornwell's first donation was from a ten-year-old boy, Willie Anderson, who gave Dr. Jacobs fifty cents to "build your orphanage." Dr. Jacobs built the orphanage with the help of his church and presided over the orphanage until his death in 1917.

Thornwell is supported by the Presbyterian Church (USA) Synod of the South Atlantic, congregations within the Synod and without, and private donations. It is at 302 Broad Street.

Most of the buildings are made of granite or with granite facings and the campus is notably attractive. Many of the buildings are part of the Thornwell-Presbyterian College Historic District which comprises the historic cores of Presbyterian College and the Thornwell Home and School for Children, together with the adjacent residential streets. The Thornwell campus is unified by consistency of materials (granite stone) and by scale. The Thornwell-Presbyterian College Historic District was listed in the National Register March 5, 1982.

Thornwell has some interesting attributes:

- It is one of the earliest American child-care facilities that used "cottages" rather than dormitories to house children.
- Cyrus McCormick, the inventor of the reaper, supported Thornwell and there was once a "McCormick Cottage" on the campus.

Thornwell is located in downtown Clinton, on South Broad Street and across the street from Presbyterian College.

== See also ==
- National Register of Historic Places listings in Laurens County, South Carolina
