= Thörnell =

Thörnell, Thornell or Törnell is a Swedish surname that may refer to:

- Olof Thörnell (1877–1977), Swedish Army general
- John F. Thornell Jr. (1921–1998), American United States Air Force officer
- Jack R. Thornell (1939–2026), American photographer
- Monica Törnell (born 1954), Swedish singer and songwriter
- Max Thornell (born 1970), Swedish musician
- Kristel Thornell (born 1975), Australian novelist
- John Thornell (athlete) (born 1985), Australian long jumper
