= Presbyterian College =

Presbyterian college in Clinton, South Carolina, US

- Former name: Clinton College (1880–1904)
- Motto: Dum Vivimus Servimus
- Motto in English: While We Live, We Serve
- Type: Private liberal arts college
- Established: 1880; 146 years ago
- Religious affiliation: Presbyterian
- Academic affiliations: APCU; Annapolis Group; CIC; SACSCOC
- Endowment: $95.6 million (2022)
- President: Anita Gustafson
- Provost: Erin McAdams
- Faculty: 102 full-time
- Students: 1,199 (Fall, 2022)
- Undergraduates: 955
- Postgraduates: 244
- Location: Clinton, South Carolina, United States; 34°27′52″N 81°52′12″W
- Campus: Small town 240-acre
- Nickname: Blue Hose
- Sporting affiliations: NCAA Division I – Big South; Pioneer Football League
- Website: presby.edu

Presbyterian College (PC) is a private liberal arts college in Clinton, South Carolina, United States. It was founded as Clinton College in 1880 and is affiliated with the Presbyterian Church (USA).

== History ==
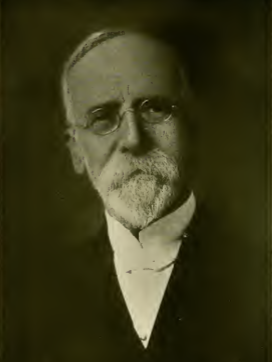
William Plumer Jacobs

Presbyterian College was founded in 1880 by William Plumer Jacobs. He served as the pastor of First Presbyterian Church in Clinton from 1864 and founded the Thornwell Orphanage.

Originally called Clinton College, its first class (including three women) graduated in 1883. In establishing PC, his "tree of knowledge," Jacobs' goal was to educate young people for lives of service to church and society, and thereby be, in his words, "epistles to Christ's honor and glory."

By the time of Jacobs' death in 1917, the college had grown considerably in size and resources, and had six major buildings. Neville Hall, PC's most recognized structure, was constructed in 1907. The tenure of president Davison McDowell Douglas (1911–1926) saw the tripling of the size of the faculty and student body, the construction of four new buildings, and growth in the college's assets from $150,000 to over $1 million. After weathering the storms of the Great Depression and Second World War, Presbyterian has continued expansion on many fronts through the second half of the twentieth century. It became fully coeducational in 1965 (and in so doing dropped its previous motto, "Where Men are Made"). In 1969, it began admitting African-American students.

== Academics ==
=== Undergraduate ===
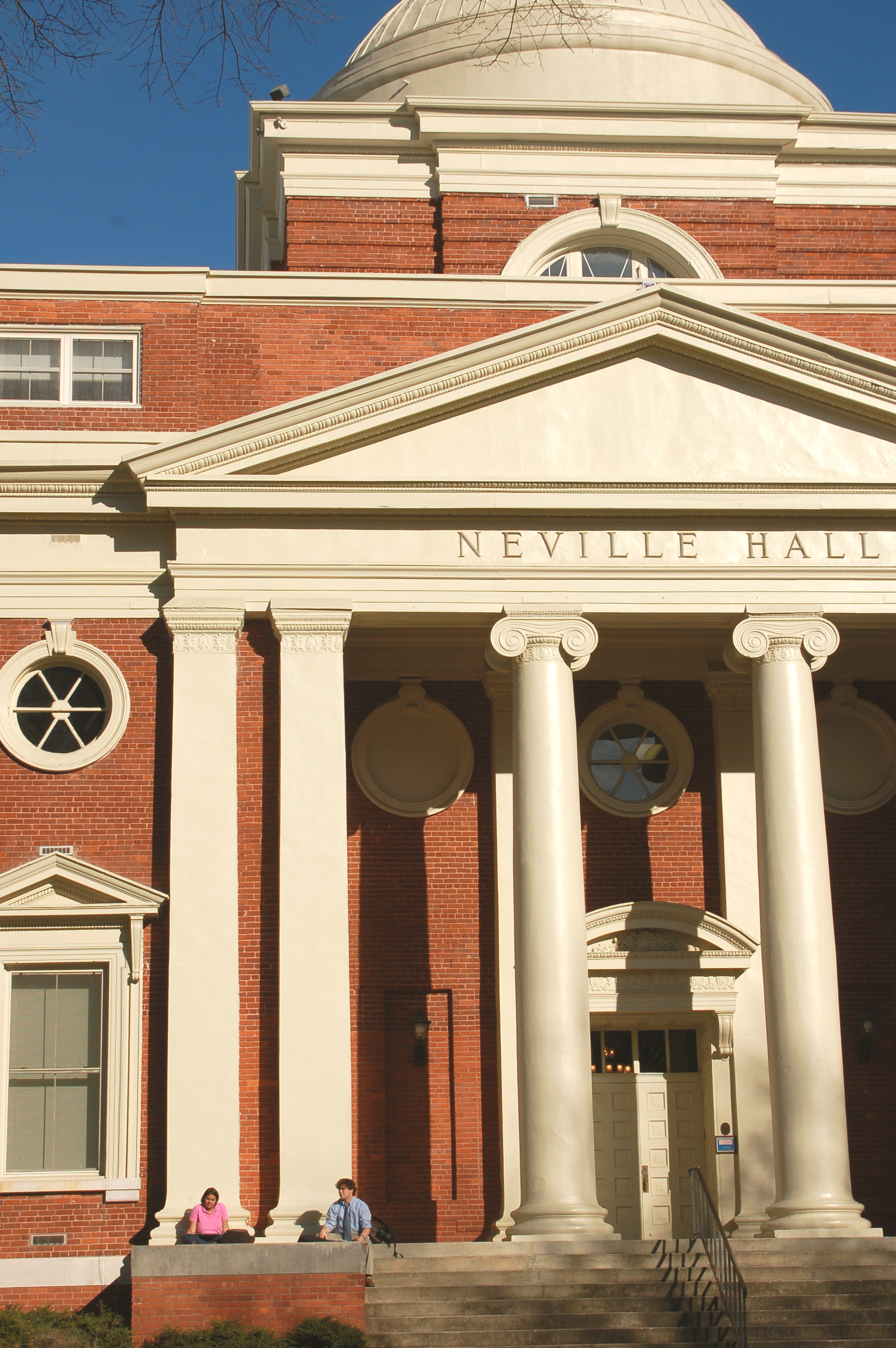
Students at Neville Hall

Presbyterian College is accredited by the Commission on Colleges of the Southern Association of Colleges and Schools (SACS). The School of the Liberal Arts confers B.A. and B.S. degrees in 30 courses of study and 9 pre-professional programs including Pre-Law, Pre-Med, Pre-Theology, and Pre-Pharmacy. PC also offers a dual-degree program in Engineering (with Clemson University, Auburn University, Georgia Tech, the University of South Carolina, and Vanderbilt University) and minor fields in an additional 13 disciplines such as Africana Studies, Media Studies, and Women's and Gender Studies. The liberal arts program has small average class sizes (13-15 students).

PC houses a Center for South Korean and East Asian Studies, which is partnered with Hannam University.

=== Graduate ===
The School of Pharmacy confers Doctor of Pharmacy degrees (PharmD) and is oriented toward serving the healthcare needs of underdeveloped and economically depressed areas of South Carolina and the greater US. A 54,000 square-foot facility, its doors opened in the fall of 2010 with an inaugural class of 80 students. The School of Pharmacy was fully accredited by the Accreditation Council for Pharmacy Education (ACPE) in July 2014. Despite its youth, it has accrued multiple awards including a Biomedical/Biobehavioral Research Administration Development (BRAD) grant from the National Institutes of Health, and a Generation Rx Champion Award from the South Carolina Pharmacy Association (SCPhA) for its efforts at raising awareness of prescription drug abuse.

== Student life ==
=== Size and makeup ===
The 2014 edition of U.S. News & World Report regards Presbyterian College as a "selective" institution that accepted 57.8% of applicants in the fall of 2012. Of PC's 1,172 undergraduates, 44% are male and 56% are female, and 97% live on campus.

=== Student organizations ===
Greek life is an important part of campus life and culture. Around 45% of the student body is affiliated with one of nine fraternities and sororities. PC offers its students other social clubs and advocacy organizations like Secular Student Alliance, College Republicans, College Democrats, and Multicultural Student Union. There are many religious ministries, including the Presbyterian Student Association, Fellowship of Christian Athletes, and Campus Outreach. Finally, Presbyterian actively promotes service organizations and opportunities.

=== Honor code ===
Since 1915 life at Presbyterian have been regulated by a student-run honor code. The signing of the honor code is a central fixture of each academic year's opening convocation ceremony and is a requirement for all incoming students, faculty, and coaches. The honor code binds one to "abstain from all deceit," to "neither give nor receive unacknowledged aid in [one's] academic work," to "respect the persons and property of the community" and to "not condone discourteous or dishonest treatment of these by [one's] peers." Suspected violations of the honor code go before the college's honor council.

=== Campus ===
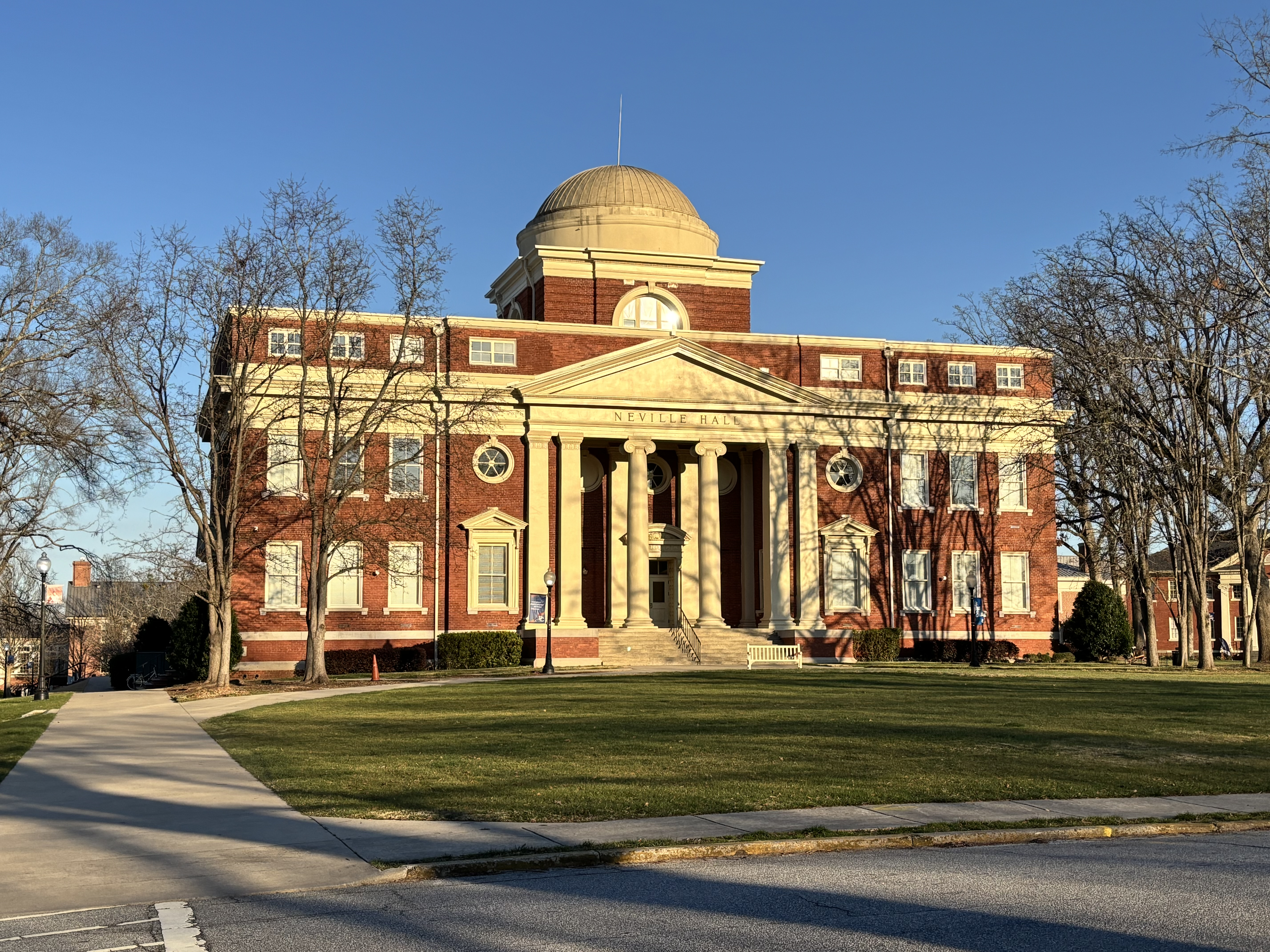
Neville Hall (pictured 2025)

PC's 240-acre (97 ha) campus covers areas in and around Clinton, providing academic buildings, dining facilities, recreational areas, and athletics venues. The college's 15 townhouses, 11 residence halls, and 9 apartments house nearly all of the undergraduate student body. Six buildings on Presbyterian College's campus (Doyle Hall, Laurens Hall, Jacobs Hall, the President's House, Neville Hall, and the campus bell tower) are part of the Thornwell-Presbyterian College Historic District, a historic district listed on the National Register of Historic Places. However, Doyle Hall was demolished in July 2014 as part of the renovations for Georgia Hall.

== Athletics ==
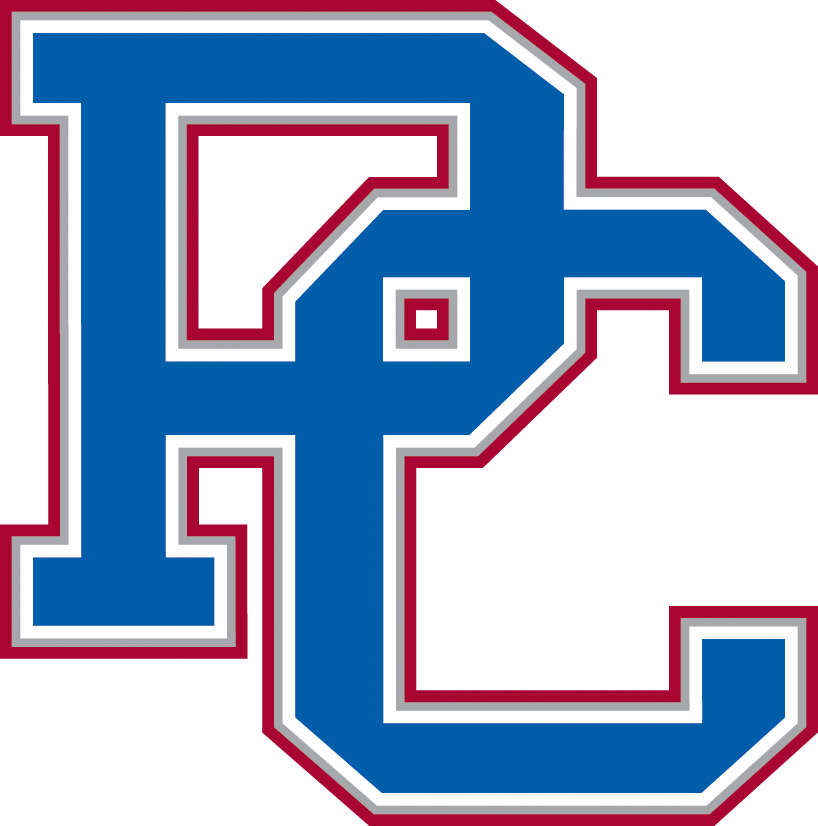
The official logo of Presbyterian College Athletics

Athletics is very important to PC's life and culture. The school competes as the Presbyterian Blue Hose for the blue socks they wore and Scoty the Scotsman is their mascot. Around 1/3 of the student body competes as student-athletes and many PC alumni are or were professional coaches at the college level, including current women's soccer coach Brian Purcell ('87), former head football coach Harold Nichols ('89), former Vanderbilt basketball head coach Roy Skinner ('52), and Bob Waters ('60), a record-setting head football coach at Western Carolina.

Presbyterian is a member of the Big South Conference of NCAA Division I and fields seventeen varsity teams in eleven sports: football (FCS), men's and women's cross country, volleyball, men's and women's soccer, men's and women's basketball, softball, men's and women's golf, men's and women's tennis, women's lacrosse, baseball, and men's and women's wrestling. Football has competed within the FCS conference Pioneer Football League since 2021. The college's colors are royal blue and garnet and its teams are known as the Blue Hose. Although PC's mascot Scottie the Scotsman is a medieval Scottish warrior, the Blue Hose name originally referred to the socks worn by the football team in the early 20th century. PC's traditional rivals include Wofford College, Furman University, The Citadel, and Newberry College.

Since 1953, the Atlantic Coast Conference has awarded the Jacobs Blocking Trophy, in honor of the memory of PC president William Plumer Jacobs II, (Note: William Plumer Jacobs II was the grandson of PC's founder, William Plumer Jacobs.) to the conference's most outstanding blocker, as voted by a poll of the conference's head coaches and defensive coordinators. The 2022 recipient is Clemson University graduate student-athlete Jordan McFadden.

=== The Bronze Derby ===
The Bronze Derby

Until 2007, PC's fierce rivalry with Newberry College was expressed in the annual Bronze Derby football game.

== Notable alumni ==
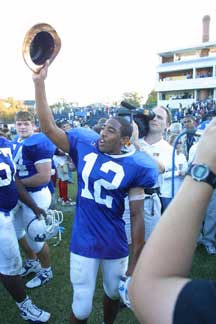
A triumphant PC player hoists the Bronze Derby

- Art Baker; head football coach
- Justin Bethel; NFL Pro Bowl defensive back for the Atlanta Falcons
- William Bradley Bryant, JD; superintendent of public schools state of Georgia
- John Bright; biblical scholar
- Glen Browder; politician and professor of political science
- Bill Cowsert, attorney, Georgia State Senator
- Harry S. Dent, Sr.; attorney, aide to U.S. Senator Strom Thurmond and U.S. President Richard Nixon
- Joan Gray; Moderator of the 217th General Assembly of the Presbyterian Church (USA)
- Kimberly Nicole Hampton (1976–2004); Captain in the United States Army and the first female US military pilot to be shot down and killed by hostile fire
- Stephen A. Hayner; president of Columbia Theological Seminary, ordained minister of the Presbyterian Church USA, professor, former president of InterVarsity Christian Fellowship
- C. Hugh Holman (1914–1981); literary scholar.
- Tammy Susan Hurt; vice chair of the board of trustees at the Recording Academy
- Grant C. Jaquith; lawyer and judge
- Douglas Kiker (1930–1991); journalist and author, NBC News national-affairs correspondent; anchor, NBC Nightly News; NBC News Rome bureau chief (Europe and Western Asia); White House correspondent, the New York Herald Tribune; Peabody Award, Columbia University's prize for broadcast journalism
- George L. Mabry, Jr.; US Army Major General, Medal of Honor recipient
- Charles B. MacDonald; US Army Deputy Chief Historian
- John McKissick; head football coach at Summerville High School (SC), the record holder for most career wins in high school football
- Allen Morris; tennis player, 1956 U.S. Davis Cup team member, quarter-finalist at Wimbledon; former head tennis coach, UNC Chapel Hill (1980–1993); inductee, North Carolina and South Carolina Tennis Halls of Fame
- Bebo Norman; contemporary Christian musician
- Ralph Norman, US representative from South Carolina's 5th congressional district
- Jim Samples; president of HGTV
- Ernest Shahid; businessman and real estate developer
- Roy Skinner (1930–2010); former head coach of the Vanderbilt Commodores men's basketball team
- Bob Staton; 18th president of Presbyterian College, and former chairman and CEO of Colonial Life & Accident Insurance Company
- Tyson Summers; football coach, head coach of the Georgia Southern University football team
- Jimmie Turner; football player
- Theodore Wardlaw; president and professor of homiletics, Austin Presbyterian Theological Seminary
- Bob Waters; head football coach and athletic director at Western Carolina University
- Lee Williamson; football player
