= Clinton, South Carolina =

- City
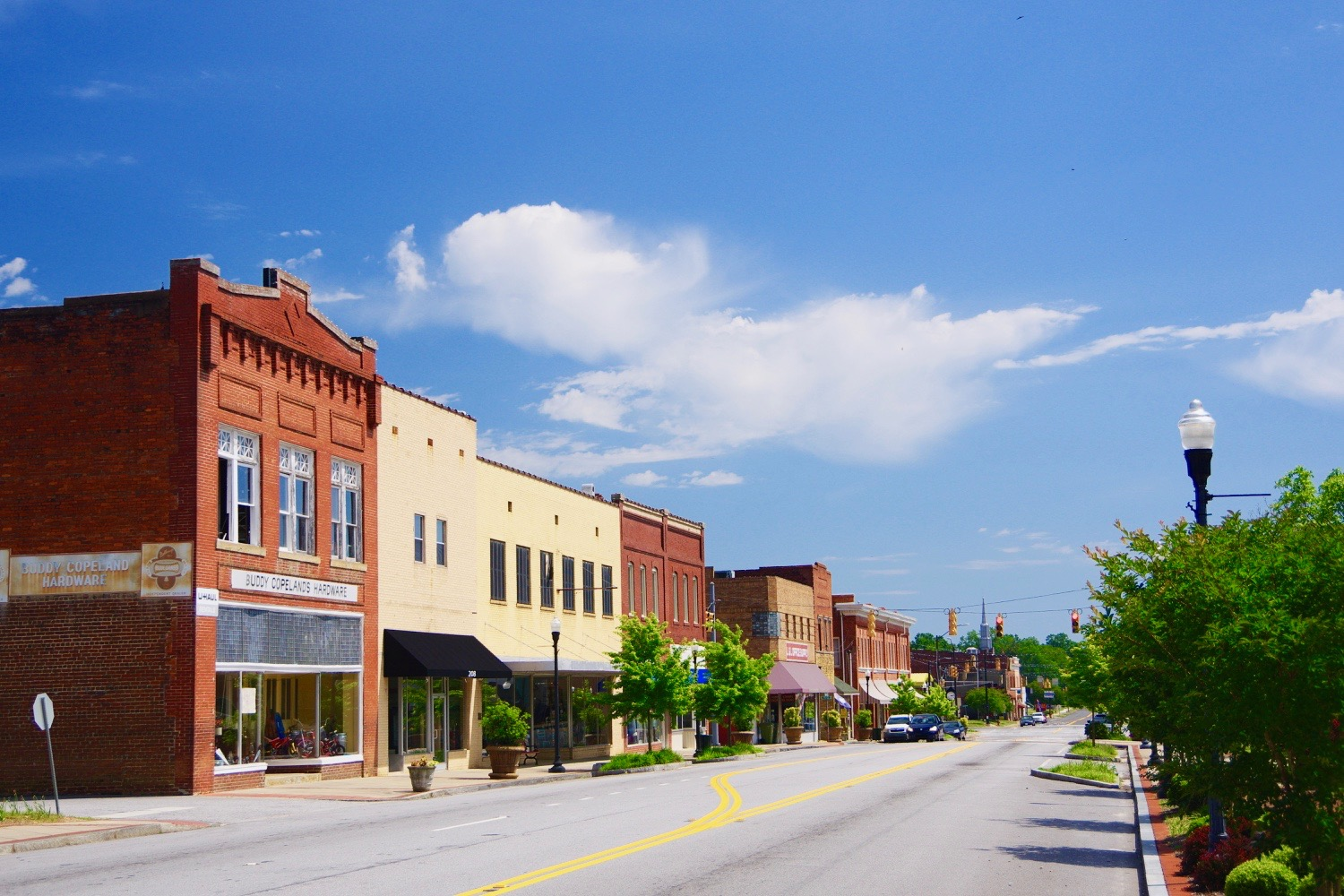
- Broad Street

- Flag Seal

- Location in South Carolina
- Coordinates: 34°29′47″N 81°52′30″W
- Country: United States
- State: South Carolina
- County: Laurens

Government
  - Type: Council–Manager
  - Mayor: Randy Randall
  - City Manager: Tom Brooks

Area
  - Total: 10.44 sq mi (27.05 km^{2})
  - Land: 10.38 sq mi (26.89 km^{2})
  - Water: 0.062 sq mi (0.16 km^{2})
- Elevation: 614 ft (187 m)

Population (2020)
  - Total: 7,633
  - Density: 735.1/sq mi (283.82/km^{2})
- Time zone: UTC-5 (Eastern (EST))
  - Summer (DST): UTC-4 (EDT)
- ZIP code: 29325
- Area codes: 864, 821
- FIPS code: 45-15295
- GNIS feature ID: 2404079
- Website: www.cityofclintonsc.com

Clinton is a city in Laurens County, South Carolina, United States. The population was 7,633 as of the 2020 census. It is part of the Greenville–Mauldin–Easley Metropolitan Statistical Area in upstate South Carolina. Clinton is the home of Presbyterian College.

== History ==
The Cherokee Indians were Clinton's original inhabitants. The first settler to inhabit the area was John Duncan, a native of Aberdeen, Scotland, who arrived in 1752 from Pennsylvania and settled along a creek between the present-day towns of Clinton and Whitmire.

Scots-Irish immigrants from Pennsylvania, Maryland, and Virginia became the predominant settlers in the area in the two decades before the American Revolutionary War and took active part in a Revolutionary War battle in 1780 at nearby Musgrove Mill.

As late as 1852, the town was called Five Points because it arose at the intersection of four major roads and the railroad. It was named Clinton after Henry Clinton Young, a lawyer from the county seat of Laurens, who planned the first roads in the area.

As the railroad began to grow, so did the town, and more plots of land were developed around the railroad. With the population's growth came the establishment of the First Presbyterian Church in 1855.

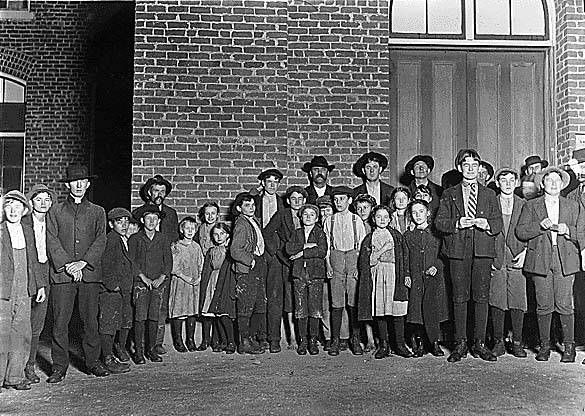
A few of the employees in the Clinton Mills, going home from work. December 1908. Photographed by Lewis Hine.

In 1895, "factory fever" had struck the town of Clinton. This came with the establishment of the Clinton Cotton Mill in 1896 by Mercer Silas Bailey, owner of the town's leading dry goods store. Lydia Cotton Mill, also owned by the Baileys and their descendants, followed in 1902. In 1933 there is a documented case of the lynching of Norris Dendy, a 33-year-old African-American man, in Clinton after he was arrested for striking a white man.

The mills continued to be a vital source of prosperity for Clinton until their closure in 2001 brought years of economic hardship from which the area is still struggling to emerge.

On August 27, 2024, a fire broke out at the House of Pizza Restaurant on Musgrove Street. The fire involved a large number of emergency personnel, injured five firefighters, and damaging or destroying neighboring businesses, including Hoyt Hanvey Jewelers.

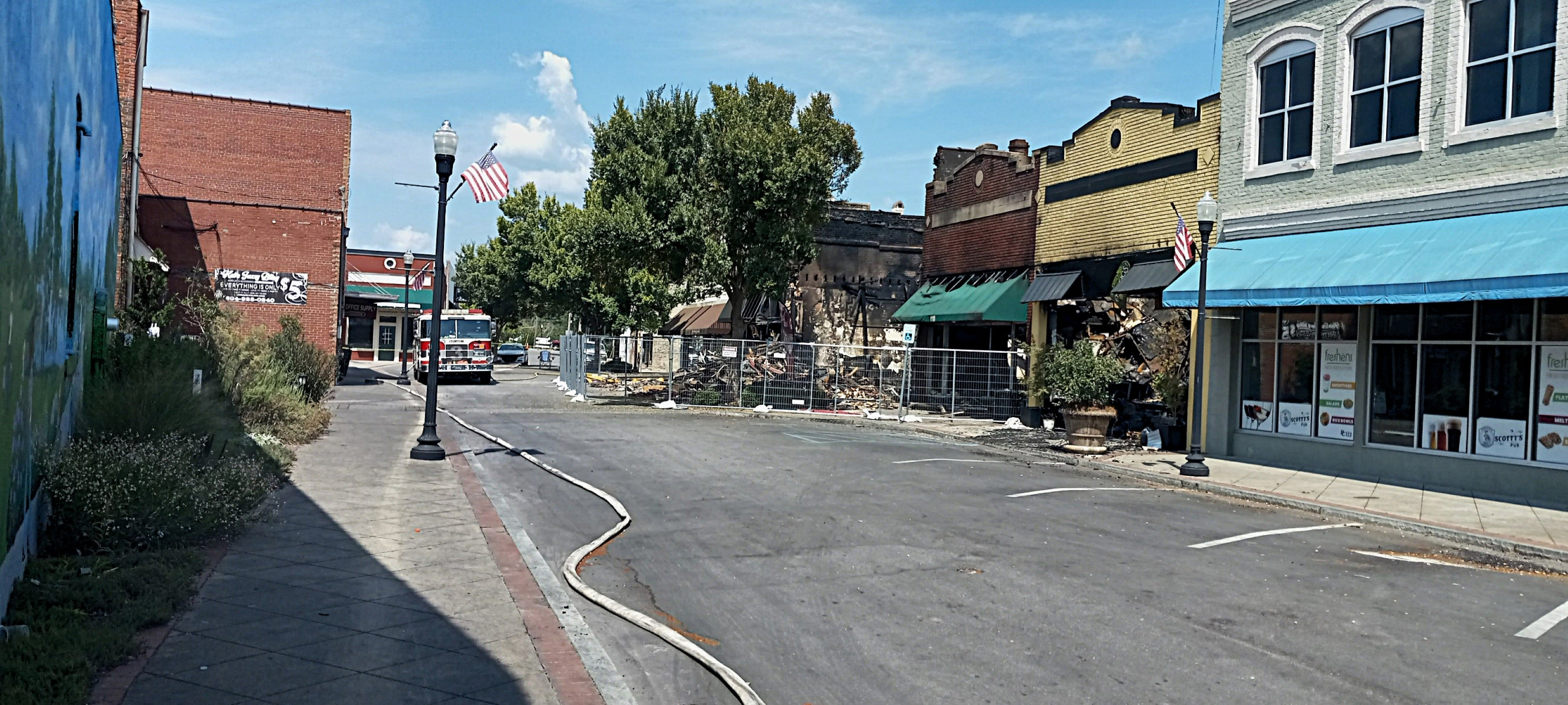
The remains of the House of Pizza restaurant in Clinton following the August 27, 2024, fire

The Clinton Commercial Historic District, Duncan's Creek Presbyterian Church, and Thornwell-Presbyterian College Historic District are listed on the National Register of Historic Places.

== Geography ==
The city is concentrated around the intersection of U.S. Route 76 and South Carolina Highway 72, south of Spartanburg and northwest of Columbia. Interstate 26 passes through the eastern portions of Clinton, and intersects Interstate 385 in the city's northern outskirts.

According to the United States Census Bureau, the city has a total area of 9.1 square miles (24 km^{2}), of which 9.1 square miles (24 km^{2}) is land and 0.1 square miles (0.26 km^{2}) (0.55%) is water.

== Demographics ==
Historical population
Census	Pop.	Note	%±
1860	197		—
1880	459		—
1890	1,021		122.4%
1900	1,869		83.1%
1910	3,272		75.1%
1920	3,767		15.1%
1930	5,643		49.8%
1940	5,704		1.1%
1950	7,168		25.7%
1960	7,937		10.7%
1970	8,138		2.5%
1980	8,596		5.6%
1990	7,987		−7.1%
2000	8,091		1.3%
2010	8,490		4.9%
2020	7,633		−10.1%
U.S. Decennial Census

=== 2020 census ===
As of the 2020 census, there were 7,633 people, 2,725 households, and 1,585 families residing in the city.

The median age was 35.0 years. 20.2% of residents were under the age of 18 and 18.4% of residents were 65 years of age or older. For every 100 females there were 85.0 males, and for every 100 females age 18 and over there were 81.5 males age 18 and over.

96.6% of residents lived in urban areas, while 3.4% lived in rural areas.

There were 2,725 households in Clinton, of which 28.4% had children under the age of 18 living in them. Of all households, 28.2% were married-couple households, 20.8% were households with a male householder and no spouse or partner present, and 45.5% were households with a female householder and no spouse or partner present. About 38.2% of all households were made up of individuals and 16.7% had someone living alone who was 65 years of age or older.

There were 3,359 housing units, of which 18.9% were vacant. The homeowner vacancy rate was 5.0% and the rental vacancy rate was 11.4%.

Racial composition as of the 2020 census
Race	Number	Percent
White	4,249	55.7%
Black or African American	2,910	38.1%
American Indian and Alaska Native	16	0.2%
Asian	98	1.3%
Native Hawaiian and Other Pacific Islander	1	0.0%
Some other race	92	1.2%
Two or more races	267	3.5%
Hispanic or Latino (of any race)	208	2.7%

== Education ==
Laurens County School District 56 covers the eastern and southeastern parts of Laurens County, including the town of Clinton. Summit Classical School, Eastside Elementary, Clinton Elementary, Joanna-Woodson Elementary, Clinton Middle School, and Clinton High School serve the town's students.

Both Clinton Middle School (formerly Bell Street Middle School), and Clinton High School have gained statewide and national attention for their Science Olympiad programs, with the middle school winning 20 of the 34 South Carolina Science Olympiad Division B competitions, including two in 1986-1987 and all 17 competitions since 2003. The high school has won nine of the last eleven State tournaments, from 2009–14 and 2016–18.

Clinton is also home of Presbyterian College and Thornwell Orphanage. Both institutions were founded by Presbyterian minister and philanthropist William Plumer Jacobs while he was the pastor at First Presbyterian Church of Clinton.

== Media ==
The city of Clinton is host to two media outlets that serve the community as well as surrounding Laurens County. The Clinton Chronicle is the local newspaper and only print media source in town; it publishes new editions weekly. Founded in 1900, the Chronicle is owned by Smith Newspapers, Inc., Fort Payne, Ala. Breaking news is published to www.clintonchronicle.com as well as www.myclintonnews.com, both operated by The Clinton Chronicle staff and updated regularly between editions.

The second form of media found in Clinton is the local radio station WPCC, 96.5 FM and 1410 AM. This radio station plays beach and easy listening music and offers sports broadcasts through a partnership with ESPN Radio and Motor Racing Network. WPCC is also affiliated with the Atlanta Braves radio network.

== Government ==
Clinton operates under a council–manager form of government. The incumbent Mayor is Comer H. "Randy" Randall; he was elected to a fourth non-consecutive term in March 2023, after having served three terms from 2002 to 2013. The City Manager is Tom Brooks, who was appointed to the position by the Mayor.

=== 2023 election results ===
Race	Candidates	Votes
Mayor	Randy Randall	407
Mayor	Ronnie Roth	147
Mayor	Leonard Pitts	104
City Council Ward 2	Anita Williams	55
City Council Ward 2	Ken Turner	30
City Council Ward 2	Shaquille Harp	8
City Council Ward 2	Reginald Vance	2
City Council Ward 4	Gary Kuykendall (inc.)	76
City Council Ward 4	Stewart Owens	21
City Council Ward 4	Vernon McCall	15
City Council Ward 6	Megan Walsh (inc.)	55
City Council Ward 6	Andy Howard	52

=== 2021 election results ===
Race	Candidates	Votes
City Council Ward 1	Danny Cook (inc.)	114
City Council Ward 1	Ricky Martin	14
City Council Ward 1	Henry Anderson	3
City Council Ward 3	Robbie Neal (inc.)	unopposed
City Council Ward 5	Ronnie Roth (inc.)	34
City Council Ward 5	Mitch Meadors	31

=== 2019 election results ===
Race	Candidates	Votes
Mayor	Bob McLean (inc.)	475
Mayor	Ricky Martin	324
City Council Ward 2	Shirley Jenkins (inc.)	85
City Council Ward 2	Rosa Booker	29
City Council Ward 2	Sherri Amick	20
City Council Ward 2	Rilla Griffin	11
City Council Ward 2	Reginald Vance	4
City Council Ward 4	Gary Kuykendall (inc.)	unopposed
City Council Ward 6	Megan Walsh	70
City Council Ward 6	Jimmy Young (inc.)	53

== Notable people ==
- Cal Cooper (1922–1994), MLB pitcher
- Jackie K. Cooper (born 1941), author and film critic
- Claude Crocker (1924–2002), MLB pitcher
- Chick Galloway (1896–1969), MLB shortstop
- Kevin Long (born 1955), NFL running back
- Lil McClintock (1883-1940), Blues musician
- Carl Anthony Payne II (born 1969), actor
- Johnny Riddle (1905–1998), MLB player
- Arthur Smith (1921–2014), guitarist and songwriter
- Charlie Wilson (1905–1970), MLB shortstop and third baseman
